India has diplomatic relations with 201 states/dependencies around the globe,  having 199 missions and posts operating globally while plans to open new missions in 2020–21 hosted by 11 UN Member States.

The Ministry of External Affairs (MEA), also known as the Foreign Ministry, is the government agency responsible for the conduct of foreign relations of India.

With the world's third largest military expenditure, second largest armed force, fifth largest economy by GDP nominal rates and third largest economy in terms of purchasing power parity, India is a prominent regional power, a nuclear power, an emerging global power and a potential superpower. India assumes a growing international influence and a prominent voice in global affairs.

As a former British colony, India is a member of the Commonwealth of Nations and continues to maintain relationships with other Commonwealth countries. Since gaining independence from Britain in 1947, however, India is now classified as a newly industrialised country and has cultivated an extensive network of foreign relations with other states. As a member state of BRICS - a repertoire of emerging major economies that also encompasses Brazil, Russia, China and South Africa, India also exerts a salient influence as the founding member of the Non-Aligned Movement. In recent decades, India has pursued a more expansive foreign policy that encompasses the neighborhood first policy embodied by SAARC as well as the Look East policy to forge more extensive economic and strategic relationships with other East Asian countries. Moreover, India was one of the founding members of several international organisations—the United Nations, the Asian Development Bank, New Development BRICS Bank, and G-20, widely considered the main economic locus of emerging and developed nations.

India has also played an important and influential role in other international organisations like East Asia Summit, World Trade Organization, International Monetary Fund (IMF), G8+5 and IBSA Dialogue Forum. India is also a member of the Asian Infrastructure Investment Bank and the Shanghai Cooperation Organisation.

Regionally, India is a part of SAARC and BIMSTEC. India is currently seeking a permanent seat in the UN Security Council, along with the other G4 nations.

India wields enormous influence in global affairs and can be classified as an emerging superpower.

History

India's relations with the world have evolved since the British Raj (1857–1947), when the British Empire took responsibility for handling external and defence relations. When India gained independence in 1947, few Indians had experience in making or conducting foreign policy. However, the country's oldest political party, the Indian National Congress, had established a small foreign department in 1925 to make overseas contacts and to publicise its independence struggle. From the late 1920s on, Jawaharlal Nehru, who had a long-standing interest in world affairs among independence leaders, formulated the Congress stance on international issues. As Prime Minister and Minister of External Affairs from 1947, Nehru articulated India's approach to the world.

India's international influence varied over the years after independence. Indian prestige and moral authority were high in the 1950s and facilitated the acquisition of developmental assistance from both East and West. Although the prestige stemmed from India's nonaligned stance, the nation was unable to prevent Cold War politics from becoming intertwined with interstate relations in South Asia.  On the intensely debated Kashmir issue with Pakistan, India lost credibility by rejecting United Nations calls for a plebiscite in the disputed area.

In the 1960s and 1970s India's international position among developed and developing countries faded in the course of wars with China and Pakistan, disputes with other countries in South Asia, and India's attempt to match Pakistan's support from the United States and China by signing the Indo-Soviet Treaty of Friendship and Cooperation in August 1971. Although India obtained substantial Soviet military and economic aid, which helped to strengthen the nation, India's influence was undercut regionally and internationally by the perception that its friendship with the Soviet Union prevented a more forthright condemnation of the Soviet presence in Afghanistan. In the late 1980s, India improved relations with the United States, other developed countries, and China while continuing close ties with the Soviet Union. Relations with its South Asian neighbours, especially Pakistan, Sri Lanka, and Nepal, occupied much of the energies of the Ministry of External Affairs.

Even before independence, the Indian colonial government maintained semi-autonomous diplomatic relations. It had colonies (such as the Aden Settlement), who sent and received full missions,. India was a founder member of both the League of Nations and the United Nations. After India gained independence from the United Kingdom in 1947, it soon joined the Commonwealth of Nations and strongly supported independence movements in other colonies, like the Indonesian National Revolution. The partition and various territorial disputes, particularly that over Kashmir, would strain its relations with Pakistan for years to come. During the Cold War, India adopted a foreign policy of not aligning itself with any major power bloc. However, India developed close ties with the Soviet Union and received extensive military support from it.

The end of the Cold War significantly affected India's foreign policy, as it did for much of the world. The country now seeks to strengthen its diplomatic and economic ties with the United States, the European Union trading bloc, Japan, Israel, Mexico, and Brazil. India has also forged close ties with the member states of the Association of Southeast Asian Nations, the African Union, the Arab League and Iran.

Though India continues to have a military relationship with Russia, Israel has emerged as India's second largest military partner while India has built a strong strategic partnership with the United States. The foreign policy of Narendra Modi indicated a shift towards focusing on the Asian region and, more broadly, trade deals.

Policy
India's foreign policy has always regarded the concept of neighbourhood as one of widening concentric circles, around a central axis of historical and cultural commonalities.

As many as 44 million people of Indian origin live and work abroad and constitute an important link with the mother country. An important role of India's foreign policy has been to ensure their welfare and wellbeing within the framework of the laws of the country where they live.

Role of the Prime Minister

Jawaharlal Nehru, India's first Prime Minister, promoted a strong personal role for the Prime Minister but a weak institutional structure. Nehru served concurrently as Prime Minister and Minister of External Affairs; he made all major foreign policy decisions himself after consulting with his advisers and then entrusted the conduct of international affairs to senior members of the Indian Foreign Service. He was the main founding fathers of the Panchsheel or the Five Principles of Peaceful Co-existence.

His successors continued to exercise considerable control over India's international dealings, although they generally appointed separate ministers of external affairs.

India's second prime minister, Lal Bahadur Shastri (1964–66), expanded the Prime Minister Office (sometimes called the Prime Minister's Secretariat) and enlarged its powers. By the 1970s, the Office of the Prime Minister had become the de facto coordinator and supra-ministry of the Indian government. The enhanced role of the office strengthened the prime minister's control over foreign policy making at the expense of the Ministry of External Affairs. Advisers in the office provided channels of information and policy recommendations in addition to those offered by the Ministry of External Affairs. A subordinate part of the office—the Research and Analysis Wing (RAW)—functioned in ways that significantly expanded the information available to the prime minister and his advisers. The RAW gathered intelligence, provided intelligence analysis to the Office of the Prime Minister, and conducted covert operations abroad.

The prime minister's control and reliance on personal advisers in the Office of the Prime Minister was particularly strong under the tenures of Indira Gandhi (1966–77 and 1980–84) and her son, Rajiv (1984–89), who succeeded her, and weaker during the periods of coalition governments. Observers find it difficult to determine whether the locus of decision-making authority on any particular issue lies with the Ministry of External Affairs, the Council of Ministers, the Office of the Prime Minister, or the prime minister himself.

The Prime Minister is however free to appoint advisers and special committees to examine various foreign policy options and areas of interest. In a recent instance, Manmohan Singh appointed K. Subrahmanyam in 2005 to head a special government task force to study 'Global Strategic Developments' over the next decade. The Task Force submitted its conclusions to the Prime Minister in 2006. The report has not yet been released in the public domain.

Ministry of External Affairs

The Ministry of External Affairs is the Indian government's agency responsible for the foreign relations of India. The Minister of External Affairs holds cabinet rank as a member of the Council of Ministers.

Subrahmanyam Jaishankar is current Minister of External Affairs. The Ministry has a Minister of State V Muraleedharan. The Indian Foreign Secretary is the head of Indian Foreign Service (IFS) and therefore, serves as the head of all Indian (ambassadors) and high commissioners. Vinay Mohan Kwatra is the current Foreign Secretary of India.

Act East Policy

In the post Cold War era, a significant aspect of India's foreign policy is the Look East Policy. During the cold war, India's relations with its South East Asian neighbours was not very strong. After the end of the cold war, the government of India particularly realised the importance of redressing this imbalance in India's foreign policy. Consequently, the Narsimha Rao government in the early nineties of the last century unveiled the look east policy. Initially it focused on renewing political and economic contacts with the countries of East and South-East Asia.

At present, under the Look East Policy, the Government of India is giving special emphasis on the economic development of backward north eastern region of India taking advantage of huge market of ASEAN as well as of the energy resources available in some of the member countries of ASEAN like Burma. Look-east policy was launched in 1991 just after the end of the cold war, following the dissolution of the Soviet Union. After the start of liberalisation, it was a very strategic policy decision taken by the government in the foreign policy. To quote Prime Minister Manmohan Singh "it was also a strategic shift in India's vision of the world and India's place in the evolving global economy".

The policy was given an initial thrust with the then Prime Minister Narasimha Rao visiting China, Japan, South Korea, Vietnam and Singapore and India becoming an important dialogue partner with ASEAN in 1992. Since the beginning of this century, India has given a big push to this policy by becoming a summit level partner of ASEAN (2002) and getting involved in some regional initiatives such as the BIMSTEC and the Ganga–Mekong Cooperation and now becoming a member of the East Asia Summit (EAS) in December 2005.

Since the dissolution of the Soviet Union, India has forged a closer partnership with Western powers. In the 1990s, India's economic problems and the demise of the bipolar world political system forced India to reassess its foreign policy and adjust its foreign relations. Previous policies proved inadequate to cope with the serious domestic and international problems facing India. The end of the Cold War gutted the core meaning of nonalignment and left Indian foreign policy without significant direction. The hard, pragmatic considerations of the early 1990s were still viewed within the nonaligned framework of the past, but the disintegration of the Soviet Union removed much of India's international leverage, for which relations with Russia and the other post-Soviet states could not compensate. After the dissolution of the Soviet Union, India improved its relations with the United States, Canada, France, Japan and Germany. In 1992, India established formal diplomatic relations with Israel and this relationship grew during the tenures of the National Democratic Alliance (NDA) government and the subsequent United Progressive Alliance (UPA) governments.

In the mid-1990s, India attracted the world attention towards the Pakistan-backed terrorism in Kashmir. The Kargil War resulted in a major diplomatic victory for India. The United States and European Union recognised the fact that Pakistani military had illegally infiltrated into Indian territory and pressured Pakistan to withdraw from Kargil. Several anti-India militant groups based in Pakistan were labelled as terrorist groups by the United States and European Union.

In 1998, India tested nuclear weapons for the second time (see Pokhran-II) which resulted in several US, Japanese and European sanctions on India. India's then defence minister, George Fernandes, said that India's nuclear programme was necessary as it provided a deterrence to potential Chinese nuclear threat. Most of the sanctions imposed on India were removed by 2001.

After September 11 attacks in 2001, Indian intelligence agencies provided the US with significant information on Al-Qaeda and related groups' activities in Pakistan and Afghanistan. India's extensive contribution to the War on Terror, coupled with a surge in its economy, has helped India's diplomatic relations with several countries. Over the past three years, India has held numerous joint military exercises with US and European nations that have resulted in a strengthened US-India and EU-India bilateral relationship. India's bilateral trade with Europe and United States had more than doubled in the five years since 2003.

India has been pushing for reforms in the UN and WTO with mixed results. India's candidature for a permanent seat at the UN Security Council is currently backed by several countries including France, Russia, the United Kingdom, Germany, Japan, Brazil, Australia and UAE. In 2004, the United States signed a nuclear co-operation agreement with India even though the latter is not a part of the Nuclear Non-Proliferation Treaty. The US argued that India's strong nuclear non-proliferation record made it an exception, however this has not persuaded other Nuclear Suppliers Group members to sign similar deals with India. During a state visit to India in November 2010, US president Barack Obama announced US support for India's bid for permanent membership to UN Security Council as well as India's entry to Nuclear Suppliers Group, Wassenaar Arrangement, Australia Group and Missile Technology Control Regime. As of January 2018, India has become member of Wassenaar Arrangement, Australia Group and Missile Technology Control Regime.

Strategic partners

India's growing economy, strategic location, mix of friendly and diplomatic foreign policy and large and vibrant diaspora has won it more allies than enemies. India has friendly relations with several countries in the developing world. Though India is not a part of any major military alliance, it has close strategic and military relationship with most of the fellow major powers.

Countries considered India's closest include the United Arab Emirates, Russian Federation, Israel, Afghanistan, France, Bhutan, Bangladesh, and the United States. Russia is the largest supplier of military equipment to India, followed by Israel and France. According to some analysts, Israel is set to overtake Russia as India's largest military and strategic partner. The two countries also collaborate extensively in the sphere of counter-terrorism and space technology. India also enjoys strong military relations with several other countries, including the United Kingdom, the United States, Japan, Singapore, Brazil, South Africa and Italy. In addition, India operates an airbase in Tajikistan, signed a landmark defence accord with Qatar in 2008, and has leased out Assumption Island from Seychelles to build a naval base in 2015.

India has also forged relationships with developing countries, especially South Africa, Brazil, and Mexico. These countries often represent the interests of the developing countries through economic forums such as the G8+5, IBSA and WTO. India was seen as one of the standard bearers of the developing world and claimed to speak for a collection of more than 30 other developing nations at the Doha Development Round. Indian Look East policy has helped it develop greater economic and strategic partnership with Southeast Asian countries, South Korea, Japan, and Taiwan. India also enjoys friendly relations with the Persian Gulf countries and most members of the African Union.

The Foundation for National Security Research in New Delhi published India's Strategic Partners: A Comparative Assessment and ranked India's top strategic partners with a score out of 90 points : Russia comes out on top with 62, followed by the United States (58), France (51), UK (41), Germany (37), and Japan (34).

Partnership agreements

India has signed strategic partnership agreements with more than two dozen countries/supranational entities listed here in the chronological order of the pacts:

Future agreements
Currently, India is taking steps towards establishing strategic partnerships with Canada and Argentina. Although India has not signed any formal strategic partnership agreements with Bhutan and Qatar, its  
foreign ministry often describes relations with these countries as 'strategic'.

Africa

Algeria

Burundi

Burundi has an embassy in New Delhi. 
India is represented in Burundi by its embassy in Kampala, Uganda. 
Both countries have a number of bilateral agreements.

Comoros

Both countries established diplomatic relations in June 1976. 
Both countries are full members of the Indian-Ocean Rim Association.

Congo

DR Congo

Ethiopia

India and Ethiopia have warm bilateral ties based on mutual co-operation and support. India has been a partner in Ethiopia's developmental efforts, training Ethiopian personnel under its ITEC programmer, providing it with several lines of credit and launching the Pan-African e-Network project there in 2007. The Second India–Africa Forum Summit was held in Addis Ababa in 2011. India is also Ethiopia's second largest source of foreign direct investments.

Egypt

Modern Egypt-India relations go back to the contacts between Saad Zaghloul and Mohandas Gandhi on the common goals of their respective movements of independence. In 1955, Egypt under Gamal Abdul Nasser and India under Jawaharlal Nehru became the founders of the Non-Aligned Movement. During the 1956 War, Nehru stood supporting Egypt to the point of threatening to withdraw his country from the Commonwealth of Nations. In 1967, following the Arab–Israeli conflict, India supported Egypt and the Arabs. In 1977, New Delhi described the visit of President Anwar al-Sadat to Jerusalem as a "brave" move and considered the peace treaty between Egypt and Israel a primary step on the path of a just settlement of the Middle East problem. Major Egyptian exports to India include raw cotton, raw and manufactured fertilisers, oil and oil products, organic and non-organic chemicals, leather and iron products. Major imports into Egypt from India are cotton yarn, sesame, coffee, herbs, tobacco, lentils, pharmaceutical products and transport equipment. The Egyptian Ministry of Petroleum is also currently negotiating the establishment of a natural gas-operated fertiliser plant with another Indian company. In 2004 the Gas Authority of India Limited, bought 15% of Egypt Nat Gas distribution and marketing company. In 2008 Egyptian investment in India was worth some 750 million dollars, according to the Egyptian ambassador.
After Arab Spring of 2011, with ousting of Hosni Mubarak, Egypt has asked for help of India in conducting nationwide elections.

Gabon

Gabon maintains an embassy in New Delhi. The Embassy of India in Kinshasa, Democratic Republic of Congo is jointly accredited to Gabon.

Ghana

Relations between Ghana and India are generally close and cordial mixed with economic and cultural connections. Trade between India and Ghana amounted to US$818 million in 2010–11 and is expected to be worth US$1 billion by 2013. Ghana imports automobiles and buses from India and companies like Tata Motors and Ashok Leyland have a significant presence in the country. Ghanaian exports to India consist of gold, cocoa and timber while Indian exports to Ghana comprise pharmaceuticals, agricultural machinery, electrical equipment, plastics, steel and cement.

The Government of India has extended $228 million in lines of credit to Ghana which has been used for projects in sectors like agro-processing, fish processing, waste management, rural electrification and the expansion of Ghana's railways. India has also offered to set up an India-Africa Institute of Information Technology (IAIIT) and a Food Processing Business Incubation Centre in Ghana under the India–Africa Forum Summit.

India is among the largest foreign investors in Ghana's economy. At the end of 2011, Indian investments in Ghana amounted to $550 million covering some 548 projects. Indian investments are primarily in the agriculture and manufacturing sectors of Ghana while Ghanaian companies manufacture drugs in collaboration with Indian companies. The IT sector in Ghana too has a significant Indian presence in it. India and Ghana also have a Bilateral Investment Protection Agreement between them. India's Rashtriya Chemicals and Fertilisers is in the process of setting up a fertiliser plant in Ghana at Nyankrom in the Shama District of the Western Region of Ghana. The project entails an investment of US$1.3 billion and the plant would have an annual production capacity of 1.1 million tones, the bulk of which would be exported to India. There are also plans to develop a sugar processing plant entailing an investment of US$36 million. Bank of Baroda, Bharti Airtel, Tata Motors and Tech Mahindra are amongst the major Indian companies in Ghana.

There are about seven to eight thousand Indians and Persons of Indian Origin living in Ghana today with some of them having been there for over 70 years. Ghana is home to a growing indigenous Hindu population that today numbers 3000 families. Hinduism first came to Ghana only in the late 1940s with the Sindhi traders who migrated here following India's Partition. It has been growing in Ghana and neighbouring Togo since the mid-1970s when an African Hindu monastery was established in Accra.

Ivory Coast

The bilateral relations between India and Ivory Coast have expanded considerably in recent years as India seeks to develop an extensive commercial and strategic partnership in the West African region. The Indian diplomatic mission in Abidjan was opened in 1979. Ivory Coast opened its resident mission in New Delhi in September 2004. Both nations are currently fostering efforts to increase trade, investments and economic co-operation.

Kenya

As littoral states of the Indian Ocean, trade links and commercial ties between India and Kenya go back several centuries. Kenya has a large minority of Indians and Persons of Indian Origin living there who are descendants of labourers who were brought in by the British to construct the Uganda Railway and Gujarati merchants.  
India and Kenya have growing trade and commercial ties. Bilateral trade amounted to $2.4 billion in 2010–2011 but with Kenyan imports from India accounting for $2.3 billion, the balance of trade was heavily in India's favour. India is Kenya's sixth largest trading partner and the largest exporter to Kenya. Indian exports to Kenya include pharmaceuticals, steel, machinery and automobiles while Kenyan exports to India are largely primary commodities such as soda ash, vegetables and tea. Indian companies have a significant presence in Kenya with Indian corporates like the Tata Group, Essar Group, Reliance Industries and Bharti Airtel operating there.

Lesotho

India operates a High Commission in Pretoria which serves Lesotho and Lesotho operates a residential mission in India. Lesotho and India have strong ties. Lesotho has backed India's bid for a Permanent UN seat and has also recognized Jammu and Kashmir as a part of India. India exported US$11 Million to Lesotho in the 2010–2011 year while only importing US$1 Million in goods from Lesotho. Since 2001, an India Army Training Team has trained several soldiers in the LDF.

Liberia

The bilateral relations between the Republic of India and the Republic of Liberia have expanded on growing bilateral trade and strategic co-operation. India is represented in Liberia through its embassy in Abidjan (Ivory Coast) and an active honorary consulate in Monrovia since 1984. Liberia was represented in India through its resident mission in New Delhi which subsequently closed due to budgetary constraints.

Mauritania

India is represented in Mauritania by its embassy in Bamako, Mali. India also has an honorary consulate in Nouakchott.

Mauritius

The relations between India and Mauritius existed since 1730, diplomatic relations were established in 1948, before Mauritius became an independent state. The relationship is very cordial due to cultural affinities and long historical ties that exist between the two nations. More than 68% of the Mauritian population are of Indian origin, most commonly known as Indo-Mauritian. Economic and commercial corporation has been increasing over the years. India has become Mauritius' largest source of imports since 2007 and Mauritius imported US$816 million worth of goods in the April 2010 – March 2011 financial year. Mauritius has remained the largest source of FDI for India for more than a decade with FDI equity inflows totalling US$55.2 billion in the period April 2000 to April 2011. India and Mauritius co-operate in combating piracy which has emerged as a major threat in the Indian Ocean region and support India's stand against terrorism.

The relationship between Mauritius and India date back in the early 1730s, when artisans were brought from Puducherry and Tamil Nadu. Diplomatic relations between India and Mauritius were established in 1948. Mauritius maintained contacts with India through successive Dutch, French and British rule. From the 1820s, Indian workers started coming into Mauritius to work on sugar plantations. From 1833 when slavery was abolished by Parliament, large numbers of Indian workers began to be brought into Mauritius as indentured labourers. On 2 November 1834 the ship named 'Atlas' docked in Mauritius carrying the first batch of Indian indentured labourers.

Morocco

Morocco has an embassy in New Delhi. It also has an Honorary Consul based in Mumbai. India operates an embassy in Rabat. Both nations are part of the Non-Aligned Movement.

In the United Nations, India supported the decolonisation of Morocco and the Moroccan freedom movement. India recognised Morocco on 20 June 1956 and established relations in 1957. The Ministry of External Affairs of the Government of India states that "India and Morocco have enjoyed cordial and friendly relations and over the years bilateral relations have witnessed significant depth and growth."

The Indian Council for Cultural Relations promotes Indian culture in Morocco. Morocco seeks to increase its trade ties with India and is seeking Indian investment in various sectors The bilateral relations between India and Morocco strengthened after the Moroccan Ambassador to India spent nearly a week in Srinagar, the capital city of Jammu and Kashmir. This showed Moroccan solidarity with India in regard to Kashmir.

Mozambique

India has a high commissioner in Maputo and Mozambique has a high commissioner in New Delhi.

Namibia

Relations between India and Namibia are warm and cordial.

India was one of SWAPO's earliest supporters during the Namibian liberation movement. The first SWAPO embassy was established in India in 1986. India's observer mission was converted to a full High Commissioner on Namibia's independence day of 21 March 1990. India has helped train the Namibian Air Force since its creation in 1995. The two countries work closely in mutual multilateral organisations such as the United Nations, Non-Aligned Movement and the Commonwealth of Nations. Namibia supports expansion of the United Nations Security Council to include a permanent seat for India.

In 2008–09, trade between the two countries stood at approximately US$80 million. Namibia's main imports from India were drugs and pharmaceuticals, chemicals, agricultural machinery, automobile and automobile parts, glass and glassware, plastic and linoleum products. India primarily imported nonferrous metals, ores and metal scarps. Indian products are also exported to neighbouring South Africa and re-imported to Namibia as South African imports. Namibian diamonds are often exported to European diamond markets before being again imported to India. In 2009, the first direct sale of Namibian diamonds to India took place. In 2008, two Indian companies won a US$105 million contract from NamPower to lay a high-voltage direct current bi-polar line from Katima Mulilo to Otjiwarongo. Namibia is a beneficiary of the Indian Technical and Economic Cooperation (ITEC) programme for telecommunications professionals from developing countries.

India has a high commissioner in Windhoek and Namibia has a high commissioner in New Delhi. Namibia's high commissioner is also accredited for Bangladesh, the Maldives and Sri Lanka.

Nigeria

India has close relations with this oil rich West African country. Twenty percent of India's crude oil needs are met, by Nigeria.  of oil, is the amount of oil, that India receives from Nigeria. Trade, between these two countries stands at $875 million in 2005–2006. Indian companies have also invested in manufacturing, pharmaceuticals, iron ore, steel, information technology, and communications, amongst other things. Both India and Nigeria, are members of the Commonwealth of Nations, G-77, and the Non-Aligned Movement. Former Nigerian President, Olusegun Obasanjo was the guest of honour, at the Republic Day parade, in 1999, and the Indian Prime Minister Manmohan Singh, visited Nigeria in 2007, and addressed the Nigerian Parliament.

Rwanda

Indo-Rwandan relations are the foreign relations between the Republic of India and the Republic of Rwanda. India is represented in Rwanda through its honorary consulate in Kigali. Rwanda has been operating its Embassy in New Delhi since 1998 and appointed its first resident Ambassador in 2001.

Seychelles

India–Seychelles relations are bilateral relations between the Republic of India and the Republic of Seychelles. India has a High Commission in Victoria while Seychelles maintains a High Commission in New Delhi.

South Africa

India and South Africa, have always had strong relations even though India revoked diplomatic relations in protest to the apartheid regime in the mid 20th century. The history of British rule connects both lands. There is a large group of Indian South Africans. Mahatma Gandhi, spent many years in South Africa, during which time, he fought for the rights of the ethnic Indians. Nelson Mandela was inspired by Gandhi. After India's independence, India strongly condemned apartheid, and refused diplomatic relations while apartheid was conducted as state policy in South Africa.

The two countries, now have close economic, political, and sports relations. Trade between the two countries grew from $3 million in 1992–1993 to $4 billion in 2005–2006, and aim to reach trade of $12 billion by 2010. One third of India's imports from South Africa is gold bar. Diamonds, that are mined from South Africa, are polished in India. Nelson Mandela was awarded the Gandhi Peace Prize. The two countries are also members of the IBSA Dialogue Forum, with Brazil. India hopes to get large amounts of uranium, from resource rich South Africa, for India's growing civilian nuclear energy sector.

South Sudan

India recognised South Sudan on 10 July 2011, a day after South Sudan became an independent state. At the moment relations are primarily economic. Pramit Pal Chaudhuri wrote in the Hindustan Times that South Sudan "has other attractions. As the Indian Foreign Ministry's own literature notes, South Sudan is reported to have "some of the largest oil reserves in Africa outside Nigeria and Angola". An article in The Telegraph reported that South Sudan is "one of the poorest [countries] in the world, [but] is oil rich. Foreign ministry officials said New Delhi has [a] keen interest in increasing its investments in the oil fields in South Sudan, which now owns over two-thirds of the erstwhile united Sudan's oil fields."

In return for the oil resources that can be provided by South Sudan, India said it was willing to assist in developing infrastructure, training officials in health, education and rural development. "We have compiled a definite road map  which India can help South Sudan."

Sudan

Indo-Sudanese relations have always been characterised as longstanding, close, and friendly, even since the early development stages of their countries. At the time of Indian independence, Sudan had contributed 70,000 pounds, which was used to build part of the National Defence Academy in Pune. The main building of NDA is called Sudan Block. The two nations established diplomatic relations shortly after India became known as one of the first Asian countries to recognise the newly independent African country. India and Sudan also share geographic and historical similarities, as well as economic interests. Both countries are former British colonies, and remotely border Saudi Arabia by means of a body of water. India and Sudan continue to have cordial relations, despite issues such as India's close relationship with Israel, India's solidarity with Egypt over border issues with Sudan, and Sudan's intimate bonds with Pakistan and Bangladesh. India had also contributed some troops as United Nations peacekeeping force in Darfur.

Togo

Togo opened its embassy in New Delhi in October 2010. The High Commission of India in Accra, Ghana is concurrently accredited to Togo. Togolese President Gnassingbé Eyadéma made an official state visit to India in September 1994. During the visit, the two countries agreed to establish Joint Commission.

Uganda

India and Uganda established diplomatic relations in 1965 and each maintain a High Commissioner in the other's capital. The Indian High Commission in Kampala has concurrent accreditation to Burundi and Rwanda. Uganda hosts a large Indian community and India–Uganda relations cover a broad range of sectors including political, economic, commercial, cultural and scientific co-operation.

Relations between India and Uganda began with the arrival of over 30,000 Indians in Uganda in the 19th century who were brought there to construct the Mombasa–Kampala railway line. Ugandan independence activists were inspired in their struggle for Ugandan independence by the success of the Indian independence movement and were also supported in their struggle by the Prime Minister of India Jawaharlal Nehru.
Indo-Ugandan relations have been good since Uganda's independence except during the regime of Idi Amin. Amin in 1972 expelled over 55,000 people of Indian origin and 5,000 Indians who had largely formed the commercial and economic backbone of the country accusing them of exploiting native Ugandans. Since the mid-1980s when President Yoweri Museveni came to power, relations have steadily improved. Today some 20,000 Indians and PIOs live or work in Uganda. Ethnic tensions between Indians and Ugandans have been a recurring issue in bilateral relations given the role of Indians in the Ugandan economy.

Zambia

Zimbabwe

African Union

As of year 2011, India's total trade with Africa is over US$46 billion and total investment is over US$11 billion with US$5.7 billion line of credit for executing various projects in Africa.

India has had good relationships with most sub-Saharan African nations for most of its history. In the Prime Minister's visit to Mauritius in 1997, the two countries secured a deal to a new Credit Agreement of INR 105 million (US$3 million) to finance import by Mauritius of capital goods, consultancy services and consumer durable from India. The government of India secured a rice and medicine agreement with the people of Seychelles. India continued to build upon its historically close relations with Ethiopia, Kenya, Uganda and Tanzania. Visits from political ministers from Ethiopia provided opportunities for strengthening bilateral co-operation between the two countries in the fields of education and technical training, water resources management and development of small industries. This has allowed India to gain benefits from nations that are generally forgotten by other Western Nations. The South African President, Thabo Mbeki has called for a strategic relationship between India and South Africa to avoid imposition by Western Nations. India continued to build upon its close and friendly relations with Angola, Botswana, Lesotho, Malawi, Mozambique, Namibia, Swaziland, Zambia and Zimbabwe. The Minister of Foreign Affairs arranged for the sending of Special Envoys to each of these countries during 1996–97 as a reaffirmation of India's assurance to strengthening co-operation with these countries in a spirit of South-South partnership. These relations have created a position of strength with African nations that other nations may not possess.

Americas
India's commonalities with developing nations in Latin America, especially Brazil and Mexico have continued to grow. India and Brazil continue to work together on the reform of Security Council through the G4 nations while have also increased strategic and economic co-operation through the IBSA Dialogue Forum. The process of finalizing Preferential Trade Agreement (PTA) with MERCOSUR (Brazil, Argentina, Uruguay, and Paraguay) is on the itinerary and negotiations are being held with Chile. Brazilian President Luiz Inácio Lula da Silva was the guest of honor at the 2004 Republic Day celebrations in New Delhi.

North
Antigua and Barbuda

Both countries have established diplomatic relations and have an Extradition Arrangement.

Barbados

India and Barbados established diplomatic relations on 30 November 1966 (the date of Barbados' national independence). On that date, the government of India gifted Barbados the throne in Barbados' national House of Assembly. India is represented in Barbados through its embassy in Suriname and an Indian consulate in Holetown, St. James. In 2011–12 the Indian-based firm Era's Lucknow Medical College and Hospital, established the American University of Barbados (AUB), as the island's first Medical School for international students. In 2015 the governments of Barbados and India signed a joint Open Skies Agreement. Today around 3,000 persons from India call Barbados home. Two-thirds are from the India's Surat district of Gujarat known as Suratis. Most of the Suratis are involved in trading. The rest are mainly of Sindhis ancestry.

Belize

India has an Honorary Consulate in Belize City and Belize has an Honorary Consulate in New Delhi. Bilateral trade stood at US$45.3 Million in 2014 and has steadily increased since. Belize and India have engaged in dialogue in Central American Integration System (SICA) discussing anti-terrorism, climate change and food security. India signed a Tax Information Exchange Agreement in 2013 with Belize. India also provides Belize US$30 Million as part of its foreign aid commitment to SICA countries. Citizens of Belize are eligible for scholarships in Indian universities under Indian Technical and Economic Cooperation Programme and the Indian Council for Cultural Relations.

The two nations share a close cultural link due to Belize's large East Indian Population, estimated at 4% of the total population.

Canada

Indo-Canadian relations, are the longstanding bilateral relations between India and Canada, which are built upon a "mutual commitment to democracy", "pluralism", and "people-to-people links", according to the government of Canada. In 2004, bilateral trade between India and Canada was at about C$2.45 billion. However, the botched handling of the Air India investigation and the case in general suffered a setback to Indo-Canadian relations. India's Smiling Buddha nuclear test led to connections between the two countries being frozen, with allegations that India broke the terms of the Colombo Plan. Although Jean Chrétien and Roméo LeBlanc both visited India in the late 1990s, relations were again halted after the Pokhran-II tests.

Canada-India relations have been on an upward trajectory since 2005. Governments at all levels, private-sector organisations, academic institutes in two countries, and people-to-people contacts—especially diaspora networks—have contributed through individual and concerted efforts to significant improvements in the bilateral relationship.

The two governments have agreed on important policy frameworks to advance the bilateral relationship. In particular, the Nuclear Cooperation Agreement (signed in June 2010) and the current successful negotiations of the Comprehensive Economic Partnership Agreement (CEPA) constitute a watershed in Canada-India relations.

The two governments have attempted to make up for lost time and are eager to complete CEPA negotiations by 2013 and ensure its ratification by 2014. After conclusion of CEPA, Canada and India must define the areas for their partnership which will depend on their ability to convert common interests into common action and respond effectively for steady co-operation. For example, during "pull-aside" meetings between Prime Minister Manmohan Singh and Stephen Harper at the G-20 summit in Mexico in June 2012, and an earlier meeting in Toronto between External Affairs Minister S. M. Krishna and John Baird, the leaders discussed developing a more comprehensive partnership going beyond food security and including the possibility of tie-ups in the energy sector, mainly hydrocarbon.

Cuba

Relations between India and Cuba are close and warm. Both nations are part of the Non-Aligned Movement. Cuba has repeatedly called for a more "democratic" representation of the United Nations Security Council and supports India's candidacy as a permanent member on a reformed Security Council. Fidel Castro said that "The maturity of India..., its unconditional adherence to the principles which lay at the foundation of the Non-Aligned Movement give us the assurances that under the wise leadership of Indira Gandhi (the former Prime Minister of India), the non-aligned countries will continue advancing in their inalienable role as a bastion for peace, national independence and development..."

India has an embassy in Havana, the capital of Cuba which opened in January 1960. This had particular significance as it symbolised Indian solidarity with the Cuban revolution. India had been one of the first countries in the world to have recognised the new Cuban government after the Cuban Revolution.

Cuba has an embassy in New Delhi, the Indian capital.

Jamaica

Relations between India and Jamaica are generally cordial and close. There are many cultural and political connections inherited from British colonial rule, such as membership in the Commonwealth of Nations, parliamentary democracy, the English language and cricket.

Both nations are members of the Non-Aligned Movement, the United Nations and the Commonwealth, and Jamaica supports India's candidacy for permanent membership on a reformed UN Security Council.

During the British era, Indians voluntarily went to jobs in Jamaica and the West Indies. This has created a considerable population of people of Indian origin in Jamaica. India has a High Commission in Kingston, whilst Jamaica has a consulate in New Delhi and plans to upgrade it to a High Commission soon.

Mexico

Mexico is a very important and major economic partner of India. Nobel Prize laureate and ambassador to India Octavio Paz wrote is book In Light of India which is an analysis of Indian history and culture. Both nations are regional powers and members of the G-20 major economies.
 India has an embassy in Mexico City.
 Mexico has an embassy in New Delhi and a consulate in Mumbai.

Nicaragua

Bilateral relations between India and Nicaragua have been limited to SICA dialogue and visits by Nicaraguan Ministers to India. India maintains an honorary consul general in Nicaragua, concurrently accredited to the Indian embassy in Panama City and Nicaragua used to maintain an embassy in India but was reduced to honorary consulate general in New Delhi. the current Foreign minister Samuel Santos López visited India in 2008 for the SICA-India Foreign ministers' meeting and in 2013 for high-level talks with the then External Affairs minister Salman Khurshid which also expanded bilateral trade with the two countries reaching a total of US$60.12 million during 2012–13.

Panama

Bilateral relations between Panama and India have been growing steadily, reflecting the crucial role the Panama Canal plays in global trade and commerce. Moreover, with over 15,000 Indians living in Panama, diplomatic ties have considerably increased over the past decade.

The opening of the expanded Canal in 2016 is expected to provide new prospects for maritime connectivity. In seeking to rapidly strengthen trade relations such the flow of trade triples between the two countries, India is keen to leverage these transit trade facilities in Panama to access the wider market of Latin America. Along with pursuing a free trade agreement, India wants to promote investment in various sectors of Panama's economy, including the banking and maritime industry and the multimodal centre of the Colón Free Trade Zone.

Paraguay

The bilateral relations between the Republic of India and the Paraguay have been traditionally strong due to strong commercial, cultural and strategic co-operation. India is represented in Paraguay through its embassy in Buenos Aires in Argentina. India also has an Honorary Consul-General in Asuncion. Paraguay opened its embassy in India in 2005.

Trinidad & Tobago

Bilateral relations between the Republic of India and the Republic of Trinidad and Tobago have considerably expanded in recent years with both nations building strategic and commercial ties. Both nations formally established diplomatic relations in 1962.

Both nations were part of the British Empire; India supported the independence of Trinidad and Tobago from British rule and established its diplomatic mission in 1962 – the year that Trinidad and Tobago officially gained independence. They possess diverse natural and economic resources and are the largest economies in their respective regions. Both are members of the Commonwealth of Nations, the United Nations, G-77 and the Non-Aligned Movement (NAM).

The Republic of India operates a High Commission in Port of Spain, whilst the Republic of Trinidad and Tobago operates a High Commission in New Delhi.

United States of America

Before and during the Second World War, the United States under President Roosevelt gave strong support to the Indian independence movement despite being allies to Britain.  Relations between India and the United States were lukewarm following Indian independence, as India took a leading position in the Non-Aligned Movement, and received support from the Soviet Union. The US provided support to India in 1962 during its war with China. For most of the Cold War, the USA tended to have warmer relations with Pakistan, primarily as a way to contain Soviet-friendly India and to use Pakistan to back the Afghan Mujahideen against the Soviet occupation of Afghanistan. An Indo-Soviet Treaty of Friendship and Cooperation, signed in 1971, also positioned India against the USA.

After the Sino-Indian War and the Indo-Pakistani War of 1965, India made considerable changes to its foreign policy. It developed a close relationship with the Soviet Union and started receiving massive military equipment and financial assistance from the USSR. This had an adverse effect on the Indo-US relationship. The United States saw Pakistan as a counterweight to pro-Soviet India and started giving the former military assistance. This created an atmosphere of suspicion between India and the US. The Indo-US relationship suffered a considerable setback when the Soviets took over Afghanistan and India overtly supported the Soviet Union.

Relations between India and the United States came to an all-time low during the early 1970s. Despite reports of atrocities in East Pakistan, and being told, most notably in the Blood telegram, of genocidal activities being perpetrated by Pakistani forces, US. Secretary of State Henry Kissinger and US President Richard Nixon did nothing to discourage then Pakistani President Yahya Khan and the Pakistan Army. Kissinger was particularly concerned about Soviet expansion into South Asia as a result of a treaty of friendship that had recently been signed between India and the Soviet Union, and sought to demonstrate to the People's Republic of China the value of a tacit alliance with the United States. During the Indo-Pakistani War of 1971, Indian Armed Forces, along with the Mukti Bahini, succeeded in liberating East Pakistan which soon declared independence. Nixon feared that an Indian invasion of West Pakistan would mean total Soviet domination of the region, and that it would seriously undermine the global position of the United States and the regional position of America's new tacit ally, China. To demonstrate to China the bona fides of the United States as an ally, and in direct violation of the Congress-imposed sanctions on Pakistan, Nixon sent military supplies to Pakistan, routing them through Jordan and Iran, while also encouraging China to increase its arms supplies to Pakistan.

The Enterprise arrived on station on 11 December 1971. On 6 and 13 December, the Soviet Navy dispatched two groups of ships, armed with nuclear missiles, from Vladivostok; they trailed US Task Force 74 into the Indian Ocean from 18 December 1971 until 7 January 1972. The Soviets also sent nuclear submarines to ward off the threat posed by USS Enterprise in the Indian Ocean.

Though American efforts had no effect in turning the tide of the war, the incident involving USS Enterprise is viewed as the trigger for India's subsequent interest in developing nuclear weapons. American policy towards the end of the war was dictated primarily by a need to restrict the escalation of war on the western sector to prevent the 'dismemberment' of West Pakistan. Years after the war, many American writers criticised the White House policies during the war as being badly flawed and ill-serving the interests of the United States. India carried out nuclear tests a few years later resulting in sanctions being imposed by United States, further drifting the two countries apart. In recent years, Kissinger came under fire for comments made during the Indo-Pakistan War in which he described Indians as "bastards". Kissinger has since expressed his regret over the comments.

After the Cold War
Since the end of the Cold War, India-USA relations have improved dramatically. This has largely been fostered by the fact that the United States and India are both democracies and have a large and growing trade relationship. During the Gulf War, the economy of India went through an extremely difficult phase. The Government of India adopted liberalised economic systems. After the break-up of the Soviet Union, India improved diplomatic relations with the members of the NATO particularly Canada, France and Germany. In 1992, India established formal diplomatic relations with Israel.

In recent years, India-United States relations have still improved significantly during the Premiership of Narendra Modi since 2014.

Pokhran tests reaction

In 1998, India tested nuclear weapons which resulted in several US, Japanese and European sanctions on India. India's then defence minister, George Fernandes, said that India's nuclear programme was necessary as it provided a deterrence to some potential nuclear threat. Most of the sanctions imposed on India were removed by 2001. India has categorically stated that it will never use weapons first but will defend if attacked.

The economic sanctions imposed by the United States in response to India's nuclear tests in May 1998 appeared, at least initially, to seriously damage Indo-American relations. President Bill Clinton imposed wide-ranging sanctions pursuant to the 1994 Nuclear Proliferation Prevention Act. US sanctions on Indian entities involved in the nuclear industry and opposition to international financial institution loans for non-humanitarian assistance projects in India. The United States encouraged India to sign the Comprehensive Nuclear-Test-Ban Treaty (CTBT) immediately and without condition. The United States also called for restraint in missile and nuclear testing and deployment by both India and Pakistan. The non-proliferation dialogue initiated after the 1998 nuclear tests has bridged many of the gaps in understanding between the countries.

South
Argentina

Formal relations between both the countries were first established in 1949. India has an embassy in Buenos Aires and Argentina has an embassy in New Delhi. The current Indian Ambassador to Argentina (concurrently accredited to Uruguay and Paraguay) is R Viswanathan.
According to the Ministry of External Affairs of the Government of India, "Under the 1968 Visa agreement, (Argentine) fees for transit and tourist visas have been abolished. Under the new visa agreement signed during Argentine Presidential visit in October 2009, it has been agreed that five-year multi-entry business visas would be given free of cost. The Embassy of India in Buenos Aires gives Cafe Con Visa (coffee with visa) to Argentine visitors. The applicants are invited for coffee and visa is given immediately. This has been praised by the Argentine media, public and the Foreign Minister himself."

Brazil

Relations between Brazil and India has been extended to diverse areas as science and technology, pharmaceuticals and space as both are member nations of BRICS. The two-way trade in 2007 nearly tripled to US$3.12 billion from US$1.2 billion in 2004. India attaches tremendous importance to its relationship with this Latin American giant and hopes to see the areas of co-operation expand in the coming years.

Both countries want the participation of developing countries in the UNSC permanent membership since the underlying philosophy for both of them are: UNSC should be more democratic, legitimate and representative – the G4 is a novel grouping for this realization.

Brazil and India are deeply committed to IBSA (South-South co-operation) initiatives and attach utmost importance to this trilateral co-operation between the three large, multi-ethnic, multi-racial and multi-religious developing countries, which are bound by the common principle of pluralism and democracy.

Bolivia

Chile

Colombia

Both countries established diplomatic ties on 19 January 1959. Since then the relationship between the two countries has been gradually increasing with more frequent diplomatic visits to promote political, commercial cultural and academic exchanges. Colombia is currently the commercial point of entry into Latin America for Indian companies.

Ecuador

Guyana

Paraguay

Peru

Suriname

Uruguay

Venezuela

Diplomatic relations between India and Venezuela were established on 1 October 1959. India maintains an embassy in Caracas, while Venezuela maintains an embassy in New Delhi.

There have been several visits by heads of state and government, and other high-level officials between the countries. President Hugo Chávez visited New Delhi on 4–7 March 2005. Chávez met with Indian President APJ Abdul Kalam and Prime Minister Manmohan Singh. The two countries signed six agreements including one to establish a Joint Commission to promote bilateral relations and another on cooperation in the hydrocarbon sector. Foreign Minister Nicolás Maduro visited India to attend the First Meeting of the India-CELAC Troika Foreign Ministers meeting in New Delhi on 7 August 2012.

The Election Commission of India (ECI) and the National Electoral Council (CNE) of Venezuela signed an MoU during a visit by Indian Election Commissioner V S Sampath to Caracas in 2012. Minister of State for Corporate Affairs visited Venezuela to attend the state funeral of President Chavez in March 2013. The President and Prime Minister of India expressed condolences on the death of Chávez. The Rajya Sabha, the upper house of Parliament, observed a minute's silence to mark his death. Ambassador Smita Purushottam represented India at the swearing-in ceremony of Chávez's successor Nicolás Maduro on 19 April 2013.

Citizens of Venezuela are eligible for scholarships under the Indian Technical and Economic Cooperation Programme and the Indian Council for Cultural Relations.

Asia

Central

Kazakhstan

India is working towards developing strong relations with this resource rich Central Asian country. The Indian oil company, Oil and Natural Gas Corporation, has got oil exploration and petroleum development grants in Kazakhstan. The two countries are collaborating in petrochemicals, information technology, and space technology. Kazakhstan has offered India five blocks for oil and gas exploration. India and Kazakhstan, are to set up joint projects in construction, minerals and metallurgy. India also signed four other pacts, including an extradition treaty, in the presence of President Prathibha Patil and her Kazakh counterpart Nursultan Nazarbayev. Kazakhstan will provide Uranium and related products under the MoU between Nuclear Power Corp. of India and Kazatomprom. These MoU also opens possibilities of joint exploration of uranium in Kazakhstan, which has the world's second largest reserves, and India building atomic power plants in the Central Asian country.

Kyrgyzstan

Tajikistan

Diplomatic relations were established between India and Tajikistan following Tajikistan's independence from the 1991 dissolution of the Soviet Union, which had been friendly with India. Tajikistan occupies a strategically important position in Central Asia, bordering Afghanistan, the People's Republic of China and separated by a small strip of Afghan territory from Pakistan. India's role in fighting the Taliban and Al-Qaeda and its strategic rivalry with both China and Pakistan have made its ties with Tajikistan important to its strategic and security policies. Despite their common efforts, bilateral trade has been comparatively low, valued at US$12.09 million in 2005; India's exports to Tajikistan were valued at US$6.2 million and its imports at US$5.89 million. India's military presence and activities have been significant, beginning with India's extensive support to the anti-Taliban Afghan Northern Alliance (ANA). India began renovating the Farkhor Air Base and stationed aircraft of the Indian Air Force there. The Farkhor Air Base became fully operational in 2006, and 12 MiG-29 bombers and trainer aircraft are planned to be stationed there.

Turkmenistan

Uzbekistan

India has an embassy in Tashkent. Uzbekistan has an embassy in New Delhi. Uzbekistan has had a great impact on Indian culture mostly due to the Mughal Empire which was founded by Babur of Ferghana (in present-day Uzbekistan) who created his empire southward first in Afghanistan and then in India.

East
China

Despite lingering suspicions remaining from the 1962 Sino-Indian War, the 1967 Nathu La and Cho La incidents, and continuing boundary disputes over Aksai Chin and Arunachal Pradesh, Sino-Indian relations have improved gradually since 1988. Both countries have sought to reduce tensions along the frontier, expand trade and cultural ties, and normalise relations.

A series of high-level visits between the two nations have helped improve relations. In December 1996, PRC President Jiang Zemin visited India during a tour of South Asia. While in New Delhi, he signed with the Indian Prime Minister a series of confidence-building measures for the disputed borders. Sino-Indian relations suffered a brief setback in May 1998 when the Indian Defence minister justified the country's nuclear tests by citing potential threats from the PRC. However, in June 1999, during the Kargil crisis, then-External Affairs Minister Jaswant Singh visited Beijing and stated that India did not consider China a threat. By 2001, relations between India and the PRC were on the mend, and the two sides handled the move from Tibet to India of the 17th Karmapa in January 2000 with delicacy and tact. In 2003, India formally recognised Tibet as a part of China, and China recognised Sikkim as a formal part of India in 2004.

Since 2004, the economic rise of both China and India has also helped forge closer relations between the two. Sino-Indian trade reached US$65.47 billion in 2013–14, making China the single largest trading partner of India. The increasing economic reliance between India and China has also bought the two nations closer politically, with both India and China eager to resolve their boundary dispute. They have also collaborated on several issues ranging from WTO's Doha round in 2008 to regional free trade agreement. Similar to Indo-US nuclear deal, India and China have also agreed to co-operate in the field of civilian nuclear energy. However, China's economic interests have clashed with those of India. Both the countries are the largest Asian investors in Africa and have competed for control over its large natural resources.

There was a tensed situation due to both the soldiers' stand-off in Doklam, Bhutan; but that too was resolved out early. Relations were lost due to Galwan valley skirmishes and its progress. India ceased on imports of Chinese products. Various measures were taken, such as several contracts with the Chinese companies involving in railways, networks and several items productions, were cancelled in response. 
The outbreak of Coronavirus pandemic from Wuhan also hampered the relations. Following the straining of the bonds, both the sides blamed each other on the conflict on LAC. On 29–30 August, it was reported that China had allegedly attempted to cross LAC to attain important hill tops, which was failed by Indian troops, as they were in advantage of acquiring important tops near LAC. India banned more than 250 Chinese apps, and on 16 October, it had banned the import of AC's, Refrigerators and Coolers from China.
Several core-commanders negotiations and talks were held, which resulted nothing other than vague promises then. Cross-media blaming was common.

There was even a conference held in Moscow, Russia, on 5 September between the Defence Minister of India, Rajnath Singh and Chinese Army General, Wei Fenghe, but that also ended up with no success.
The recent meeting of the Quad-alliance was also question by China, but was then downed by India.

In mid-January 2021, it was reported that both the countries had finally agreed upon the de-escalation from their positions. Several footages of Chinese troops removing tents/barracks were released. Both the countries also agreed that India would move back to Finger-3, while China retained its position back to Finger-8, and was also declared the area from Finger-3 to Finger-8 to be 
"No man's land".

Japan

India-Japan relations have always been strong. India has culturally influenced Japan through Buddhism. During World War II, the Imperial Japanese Army helped Netaji Subhash Chandra Bose's Indian National Army. Relations have remained warm since India's independence, despite Japan imposing sanctions on India after the 1998 Pokhran-II nuclear tests (the sanctions were removed in 2001).

 Japanese companies, like Sony, Toyota, and Honda, have manufacturing facilities in India, and with the growth of the Indian economy, India is a big market for Japanese firms. The most prominent Japanese company to have a big investment in India is automobiles giant Suzuki which is in partnership with Indian automobiles company Maruti Suzuki, the largest car manufacturer in India. Honda was also a partner in "Hero Honda", one of the largest motor cycle sellers in the world (the companies split in 2011).

According to Former Prime Minister Shinzō Abe's arc of freedom theory, it is in Japan's interests to develop closer ties with India, world's most populous democracy, while its relations with China remain chilly. To this end, Japan has funded many infrastructure projects in India, most notably in New Delhi's metro subway system. In December 2006, then Prime Minister Manmohan Singh's visit to Japan culminated in the signing of the "Joint Statement Towards Japan-India Strategic and Global Partnership". Indian applicants were welcomed in 2006 to the JET Programme, starting with just one slot available in 2006 and 41 in 2007. Also, in 2007, the Japan Self-Defense Forces took part in a naval exercise in the Indian Ocean, known as Malabar 2007, which also involved the naval forces of India, Australia, Singapore and the United States.

In October 2008, Japan signed an agreement with India under which it would grant the latter a low-interest loan worth US$4.5 billion to construct a high-speed rail line between Delhi and Mumbai. This is the single largest overseas project being financed by Japan and reflects growing economic partnership between the two. India and Japan signed a security co-operation agreement in which both will hold military exercises, police the Indian Ocean and conduct military-to-military exchanges on fighting terrorism, making India one of only three countries, the other two being the United States and Australia, with which Japan has such a security pact. There are 25,000 Indians in Japan as of 2008.

Mongolia

The relations between India and Mongolia are still at a nascent stage and Indo-Mongolian co-operation is limited to diplomatic visits, provision of soft loans and financial aid and the collaborations in the IT sector.

India established diplomatic relations in December 1955. India was the first country outside the Soviet bloc to establish diplomatic relations with Mongolia. Since then, there have been treaties of mutual friendship and co-operation between the two countries in 1973, 1994, 2001 and 2004.

North Korea

India and North Korea have growing trade and diplomatic relations. India had a fully functioning embassy in Pyongyang which was closed down due to COVID-19 pandemic in the host country while North Korea still operates an embassy in New Delhi. India has said that it wants the "reunification" of Korea.

South Korea

The cordial relationship between the two countries extends back to 48AD, when Queen Suro, or Princess Heo, travelled from the kingdom of Ayodhya to Korea. According to the Samguk Yusa, the princess had a dream about a heavenly king who was awaiting heaven's anointed ride. After Princess Heo had the dream, she asked her parents, the king and queen, for permission to set out and seek the man, which the king and queen urged with the belief that god orchestrated the whole fate. Upon approval, she set out on a boat, carrying gold, silver, a tea plant, and a stone which calmed the waters. Archeologists discovered a stone with two fish kissing each other, a symbol of the Gaya kingdom that is unique to the Mishra royal family in Ayodhya, India. This royal link provides further evidence that there was an active commercial engagements between India and Korea since the queen's arrival to Korea. Current descendants live in the city of Gimhae as well as abroad in America's state of New Jersey and Kentucky. Many of them became prominent and well known around the world like President Kim Dae Jung, Prime Minister Kim Jong-pil. The relations between the countries have been relatively limited, although much progress arose during the three decades. Since the formal establishment of the diplomatic ties between two countries in 1973, several trade agreements have been reached. Trade between the two nations has increased exponentially, exemplified by the $530 million during the fiscal year of 1992–1993, and the $10 billion during 2006–2007. During the 1997 Asian financial crisis, South Korean businesses sought to increase access to the global markets, and began trade investments with India. The last two presidential visits from South Korea to India were in 1996 and 2006, and the embassy works between the two countries are seen as needing improvements. Recently, there have been acknowledgements in the Korean public and political spheres that expanding relations with India should be a major economical and political priority for South Korea. Much of the economic investments of South Korea have been drained into China; however, South Korea is currently the fifth largest source of investment in India. To The Times of India, President Roh Moo-hyun voiced his opinion that co-operation between India's software and Korea's IT industries would bring very efficient and successful outcomes. The two countries agreed to shift their focus to the revision of the visa policies between the two countries, expansion of trade, and establishment of free trade agreement to encourage further investment between the two countries. Korean companies such as LG, Hyundai and Samsung have established manufacturing and service facilities in India, and several Korean construction companies won grants for a portion of the many infrastructural building plans in India, such as the "National Highway Development Project". Tata Motor's purchase of Daewoo Commercial Vehicles at the cost of $102 million highlights the India's investments in Korea, which consist mostly of subcontracting.

South

Afghanistan

Bilateral relations between India and Afghanistan have been traditionally strong and friendly. While India was the only South Asian country to recognise the Soviet-backed Democratic Republic of Afghanistan in the 1980s, its relations were diminished during the Afghan civil wars and the rule of the Islamist Taliban in the 1990s. India aided the overthrow of the Taliban and became the largest regional provider of humanitarian and reconstruction aid.
The new democratically elected Afghan government strengthened its ties with India in wake of persisting tensions and problems with Pakistan, which is continuing to shelter and support the Taliban. India pursues a policy of close co-operation to bolster its standing as a regional power and contain its rival Pakistan, which it maintains is supporting Islamic militants in Kashmir and other parts of India. India is the largest regional investor in Afghanistan, having committed more than US$3 billion for reconstruction purposes. After the Islamic Republic of Afghanistan collapsed, India participated in the evacuation of non-Muslim minorities and provided food aid to Taliban-ruled Afghanistan.

Bangladesh

India was the second country to recognise Bangladesh as a separate and independent state, doing so on 6 December 1971. India fought alongside the Bangladeshis to liberate Bangladesh from West Pakistan in 1971.

Bangladesh's relationship with India has been difficult in terms of border killing, irrigation and land border disputes post 1976. However, India has enjoyed favourable relationship with Bangladesh during governments formed by the Awami League in 1972 and 1996. The recent solutions of land and maritime disputes have taken out irritants in ties.

At the outset India's relations with Bangladesh could not have been stronger because of India's unalloyed support for independence and opposition against Pakistan in 1971. During the independence war, many refugees fled to India. When the struggle of resistance matured in November 1971, India also intervened militarily and may have helped bring international attention to the issue through Indira Gandhi's visit to Washington, D.C. Afterwards India furnished relief and reconstruction aid. India extended recognition to Bangladesh prior to the end of the war in 1971 (the second country to do so after Bhutan) and subsequently lobbied others to follow suit. India also withdrew its military from the land of Bangladesh when Sheikh Mujibur Rahman requested Indira Gandhi to do so during the latter's visit to Dhaka in 1972.

Indo-Bangladesh relations have been somewhat less friendly since the fall of Mujib government in August 1975. over the years over issues such as South Talpatti Island, the Tin Bigha Corridor and access to Nepal, the Farakka Barrage and water sharing, border conflicts near Tripura and the construction of a fence along most of the border which India explains as security provision against migrants, insurgents and terrorists. Many Bangladeshis feel India likes to play "big brother" to smaller neighbours, including Bangladesh. Bilateral relations warmed in 1996, due to a softer Indian foreign policy and the new Awami League Government. A 30-year water-sharing agreement for the Ganges River was signed in December 1996, after an earlier bilateral water-sharing agreement for the Ganges River lapsed in 1988. Both nations also have cooperated on the issue of flood warning and preparedness. The Bangladesh Government and tribal insurgents signed a peace accord in December 1997, which allowed for the return of tribal refugees who had fled into India, beginning in 1986, to escape violence caused by an insurgency in their homeland in the Chittagong Hill Tracts. The Bangladesh Army maintains a very strong presence in the area to this day. The army is increasingly concerned about a growing problem of cultivation of illegal drugs.

There are also small pieces of land along the border region that Bangladesh is diplomatically trying to reclaim. Padua, part of Sylhet Division before 1971, has been under Indian control since the war in 1971. This small strip of land was re-occupied by the BDR in 2001, but later given back to India after Bangladesh government decided to solve the problem through diplomatic negotiations. The Indian New Moore island no longer exists, but Bangladesh repeatedly claims it to be part of the Satkhira district of Bangladesh.

In recent years India has increasingly complained that Bangladesh does not secure its border properly. It fears an increasing flow of poor Bangladeshis and it accuses Bangladesh of harbouring Indian separatist groups like ULFA and alleged terrorist groups. The Bangladesh government has refused to accept these allegations. India estimates that over 20 million Bangladeshis are living illegally in India. One Bangladeshi official responded that "there is not a single Bangladeshi migrant in India". Since 2002, India has been constructing an India – Bangladesh Fence along much of the 2500 mile border. The failure to resolve migration disputes bears a human cost for illegal migrants, such as imprisonment and health risks (namely HIV/AIDS).

India's prime minister Narendra Modi and his Bangladeshi counterpart Sheikh Hasina have completed a landmark deal redrawing their messy shared border and there by solving disputes between India and Bangladesh. Bangladesh has also given India transit route to travel through Bangladesh to its North East states. India and Bangladesh also have free trade agreement on 7 June 2015.

Both countries solved its border dispute on 6 June 2015.

To connect Kolkata with Tripura via Bangladesh through railway, the Union Government on 10 February 2016 sanctioned about 580 crore rupees. The project that is expected to be completed by 2017 will pass through Bangladesh.

The Agartala-Akhaura rail-link between Indian Railway and Bangladesh Railway will reduce the current 1700 km road distance between Kolkata to Agartala via Siliguri to just 350-kilometer by railway.

The project ranks high on Prime Minister's 'Act East Policy', and is expected to increase connectivity and boost trade between India and Bangladesh.

Bhutan

Historically, there have been close ties with India. Both countries signed a friendship treaty in 1949, where India would assist Bhutan in foreign relations. On 8 February 2007, the Indo-Bhutan Friendship Treaty was substantially revised under the Bhutanese King, Jigme Khesar Namgyel Wangchuck. Whereas in the Treaty of 1949 Article 2 read as "The Government of India undertakes to exercise no interference in the internal administration of Bhutan. On its part the Government of Bhutan agrees to be guided by the advice of the Government of India in regard to its external relations."

In the revised treaty it now reads as, "In keeping with the abiding ties of close friendship and cooperation between Bhutan and India, the Government of the Kingdom of Bhutan and the Government of the Republic of India shall cooperate closely with each other on issues relating to their national interests. Neither government shall allow the use of its territory for activities harmful to the national security and interest of the other". The revised treaty also includes in it the preamble "Reaffirming their respect for each other's independence, sovereignty and territorial integrity", an element that was absent in the earlier version. The Indo-Bhutan Friendship Treaty of 2007 strengthens Bhutan's status as an independent and sovereign nation.

India continues to be the largest trade and development partner of Bhutan. Planned development efforts in Bhutan began in the early 1960s. The First Five Year Plan (FYP) of Bhutan was launched in 1961. Since then, India has been extending financial assistance to Bhutan's FYPs. The 10th FYP ended in June 2013. India's overall assistance to the 10th FYP was a little over Rs. 5000 crores, excluding grants for hydropower projects. India has committed Rs. 4500 crores for Bhutan's 11th FYP along with Rs. 500 crores as an Economic Stimulus Package.

The hydropower sector is one of the main pillars of bilateral co-operation, exemplifying mutually beneficial synergy by providing clean energy to India and exports revenue to Bhutan (power contributes 14% to the Bhutanese GDP, comprising about 35% of Bhutan's total exports). Three hydroelectric projects (HEPs) totaling 1416 MW, (336 MW Chukha HEP, the 60 MW Kurichu HEP, and the 1020 MW Tala HEP), are already exporting electricity to India. In 2008 the two governments identified ten more projects for development with a total generation capacity of 10,000 MW. Of these, three projects totaling 2940 MW (1200 MW Punatsangchu-I, 1020 MW Punatsangchu-II and 720 MW Mangdechu HEPs) are under construction and are scheduled to be commissioned in the last quarter of 2017–2018. Out of the remaining 7 HEPs, 4 projects totaling 2120 MW (600 MW Kholongchhu, 180 MW Bunakha, 570 MW Wangchu and 770 MW Chamkarchu) will be constructed under Joint Venture model, for which a Framework Inter-Governmental Agreement was signed between both governments in 2014. Of these 4 JV-model projects, pre-construction activities for Kholongchhu HEP have commenced. Tata Power is also building a hydro-electric dam in Bhutan.

India had assisted Bhutan by deploying its troops in Doklam in 2017- a territory claimed and controlled under Bhutanese government- to resist a Chinese army's control and construction of military structures.

Maldives

India enjoys a considerable influence over Maldives' foreign policy and provides extensive security co-operation especially after the Operation Cactus in 1988 during which India repelled Tamil mercenaries who invaded the country.

As a founder member in 1985 of the South Asian Association for Regional Cooperation, SAARC, which brings together Afghanistan, Bangladesh, Bhutan, India, Maldives, Nepal, Pakistan and Sri Lanka, the country plays a very active role in SAARC. The Maldives has taken the lead in calling for a South Asian Free Trade Agreement, the formulation of a Social Charter, the initiation of informal political consultations in SAARC forums, the lobbying for greater action on environmental issues, the proposal of numerous human rights measures such as the regional convention on child rights and for setting up a SAARC Human Rights Resource Centre. The Maldives is also an advocate of greater international profile for SAARC such as through formulating common positions at the UN.

India is starting the process to bring the island country into India's security grid. The move comes after the moderate Islamic nation approached New Delhi earlier this year over fears that one of its island resorts could be taken over by terrorists given its lack of military assets and surveillance capabilities.
India also signed an agreement with the Maldives in 2011 which is centred around the following:
 India shall permanently base two helicopters in the country to enhance its surveillance capabilities and ability to respond swiftly to threats. One helicopter from the Coast Guard was handed over during A. K. Antony's visit while another from the Navy will be cleared for transfer shortly.
 Maldives has coastal radars on only two of its 26 atolls. India will help set up radars on all 26 for seamless coverage of approaching vessels and aircraft.
 The coastal radar chain in Maldives will be networked with the Indian coastal radar system. India has already undertaken a project to install radars along its entire coastline. The radar chains of the two countries will be interlinked and a central control room in India's Coastal Command will get a seamless radar picture.
 The Indian Coast Guard (ICG) will carry out regular Dornier sorties over the island nation to look out for suspicious movements or vessels. The Southern Naval Command will facilitate the inclusion of Maldives into the Indian security grid.
 Military teams from Maldives will visit the tri-services Andaman & Nicobar Command (ANC) to observe how India manages security and surveillance of the critical island chain.

Nepal

Relations between India and Nepal are close yet fraught with difficulties stemming from border disputes, geography, economics, the problems inherent in big power-small power relations, and common ethnic and linguistic identities that overlap the two countries' borders. In 1950 New Delhi and Kathmandu initiated their intertwined relationship with the Treaty of Peace and Friendship and accompanying secret letters that defined security relations between the two countries, and an agreement governing both bilateral trade and trade transiting Indian soil. The 1950 treaty and letters stated that "neither government shall tolerate any threat to the security of the other by a foreign aggressor" and obligated both sides "to inform each other of any serious friction or misunderstanding with any neighboring state likely to cause any breach in the friendly relations subsisting between the two governments", and also granted the Indian and Nepali citizens right to get involved in any economic activity such as work and business related activity in each other's territory. These accords cemented a "special relationship" between India and Nepal that granted Nepalese in India the same economic and educational opportunities as Indian citizens.

Relations between India and Nepal reached its lowest during 1989 when India imposed a 13-month-long economic blockade of Nepal. Indian PM Narendra Modi visited Nepal in 2014, the first by an Indian PM in nearly 17 years.

In 2015, a blockade of the India-Nepal border has affected relations. The blockade is led by ethnic communities angered by Nepal's recently promulgated new constitution. However, the Nepalese government accuses India of deliberately worsening the embargo, but India denies it.

India had aided Nepal during 2015 Kathmandu earthquake with financial aid of $1 billion, and launching Operation Maitri.

The relations were strained during mid 2020, when it was reported that a firing took place by the Nepalese police across Indo-Nepalese border of Bihar on 12 July. Nepalese Prime Minister KP Sharma Oli commented about the pandemic of Coronavirus that "Indian virus was more deadlier" than the one which spread from Wuhan. As the time progressed, certain claims were also made on the Indian territories, for example, Kalapani, Limpiyadhura and Lipulekh of Uttarakhand. Similarly, the claims were also made culturally, when it was said that Hindu God Ram was Nepalese, that he was born in Thori, west of Birgunj, and that Ayodhya in Uttar Pradesh was fake. Rules were made strict for Indians in Nepal along with banning some Indian media.
Indian media stated that the actions of Oli government were souring the relations, "and these were being done on the direction of China and propelled by Chinese ambassador Hou Yanqi". Speculations were made that since China could not handle India directly, in aftermath of the LAC skirmish, it was lurking and trapping its neighboring countries and provoking them against India. In August, there were reports about the Chinese "illegal occupations" on Nepal's border states' areas.

Pakistan

Despite historical, cultural and ethnic links between them, relations between India and Pakistan have been "plagued" by years of mistrust and suspicion ever since the partition of India in 1947. The principal source of contention between India and its western neighbour has been the Kashmir conflict. After an invasion by Pashtun tribesmen and Pakistani paramilitary forces, the Hindu Maharaja of the Dogra Kingdom of Jammu and Kashmir, Hari Singh, and its Muslim Prime Minister, Sheikh Abdullah, signed an Instrument of Accession with New Delhi. The First Kashmir War started after the Indian Army entered Srinagar, the capital of the state, to secure the area from the invading forces. The war ended in December 1948 with the Line of Control dividing the erstwhile princely state into territories administered by Pakistan (northern and western areas) and India (southern, central and northeastern areas). Pakistan contested the legality of the Instrument of Accession since the Dogra Kingdom has signed a standstill agreement with it. The Indo-Pakistani War of 1965 started following the failure of Pakistan's Operation Gibraltar, which was designed to infiltrate forces into Jammu and Kashmir to precipitate an insurgency against rule by India. The five-week war caused thousands of casualties on both sides. It ended in a United Nations (UN) mandated ceasefire and the subsequent issuance of the Tashkent Declaration. India and Pakistan went to war again in 1971, this time the conflict being over East Pakistan. The large-scale atrocities committed there by the Pakistan army led to millions of Bengali refugees pouring over into India. India, along with the Mukti Bahini, defeated Pakistan and the Pakistani forces surrendered on the eastern front. The war resulted in the creation of Bangladesh. In 1998, India carried out the Pokhran-II nuclear tests which was followed by Pakistan's Chagai-I tests. Following the Lahore Declaration in February 1999, relations briefly improved. A few months later, however, Pakistani paramilitary forces and Pakistan Army, infiltrated in large numbers into the Kargil district of Indian Kashmir. This initiated the Kargil War after India moved in thousands of troops to successfully flush out the infiltrators. Although the conflict did not result in a full-scale war between India and Pakistan, relations between the two reached all-time low which worsened even further following the involvement of Pakistan-based terrorists in the hijacking of the Indian Airlines Flight 814 in December 1999. Attempts to normalise relations, such as the Agra summit held in July 2001, failed. An attack on the Indian Parliament in December 2001, which was blamed on Pakistan, which had condemned the attack caused a military standoff between the two countries which lasted for nearly a year raising fears of a nuclear warfare. However, a peace process, initiated in 2003, led to improved relations in the following years.

Since the initiation of the peace process, several confidence-building-measures (CBMs) between India and Pakistan have taken shape. The Samjhauta Express and Delhi–Lahore Bus service are two of these successful measures which have played a crucial role in expanding people-to-people contact between the two countries. The initiation of Srinagar–Muzaffarabad Bus service in 2005 and opening of a historic trade route across the Line of Control in 2008 further reflects increasing eagerness between the two sides to improve relations. Although bilateral trade between India and Pakistan was a modest US$1.7 billion in March 2007, it is expected to cross US$10 billion by 2010. After the 2005 Kashmir earthquake, India sent aid to affected areas in Pakistani Kashmir and Punjab as well as Indian Kashmir.

The 2008 Mumbai attacks seriously undermined the relations between the two countries. India alleged Pakistan of harbouring militants on their soil, while Pakistan vehemently denied such claims.

A new chapter started in India Pakistan relation when a new NDA government took charge in Delhi after victory in 2014 election and invited SAARC members' leaders in oath taking ceremony. Subsequently, visit of Indian Prime Minister on 25 December informally to wish Pakistani Prime minister Nawaz Sharif on his Birth Day and participate in his daughter's wedding. It was hoped that the relation between the neighbour will improve but attack on Indian army camp by Pakistani infiltrators on 18 September 2016 and subsequent surgical strike by India aggravated the already strained relation between the nations.

A SAARC summit scheduled in Islamabad was called off because of after boycott by India and other SAARC member's subsequently.

The relation took a further nosedive after another attack on CRPF in February 2019 by a terrorist associated with the Pakistan-based terror organisation, Jaish-e-Mohammed, when the terrorist rammed his vehicle packed with explosive against a bus carrying  CRPF soldiers in Pulwama, Kashmir, killing 40. India blamed Pakistan which was denied by the Pakistani establishment. India retaliated with an airstrike on Balakot, a region claimed and controlled by Pakistan.

A new chapter in peace was ignited, when it was suddenly declared that a back-door peace settlement over ceasing the cross-border firing across LOC was signed between the armies of both sides, and a steady growth in the countries' coming together was observed.

Sri Lanka

Bilateral relations between Sri Lanka and India has enjoyed historically a good relationship. The two countries share near-identical racial and cultural ties. According to traditional Sri Lankan chronicles (Dipavamsa), Buddhism was introduced into Sri Lanka in the 4th century BCE by Venerable Mahinda, the son of Indian Emperor Ashoka, during the reign of Sri Lanka's King Devanampiya Tissa. During this time, a sapling of the Bodhi Tree was brought to Sri Lanka and the first monasteries and Buddhist monuments were established.Nevertheless, relation post independence were affected by the Sri Lankan Civil War and by the failure of Indian intervention during the civil war as well as India's support for Tamil Tiger militants. India is Sri Lanka's only neighbour, separated by the Palk Strait; both nations occupy a strategic position in South Asia and have sought to build a common security umbrella in the Indian Ocean.

India-Sri Lanka relations have undergone a qualitative and quantitative transformation in the recent past. Political relations are close, trade and investments have increased dramatically, infrastructural linkages are constantly being augmented, defence collaboration has increased and there is a general, broad-based improvement across all sectors of bilateral co-operation. India was the first country to respond to Sri Lanka's request for assistance after the tsunami in December 2004. In July 2006, India evacuated 430 Sri Lankan nationals from Lebanon, first to Cyprus by Indian Navy ships and then to Delhi and Colombo by special Air India flights.

There exists a broad consensus within the Sri Lankan polity on the primacy of India in Sri Lanka's external relations matrix. Both the major political parties in Sri Lanka, the Sri Lanka Freedom Party and the United Nationalist Party have contributed to the rapid development of bilateral relations in the last ten years. Sri Lanka has supported India's candidature to the permanent membership of the UN Security Council.

SAARC
Certain aspects of India's relations within the subcontinent are conducted through the South Asian Association for Regional Cooperation (SAARC). Its members other than India are Afghanistan, Bangladesh, Bhutan, Maldives, Nepal, Pakistan and Sri Lanka. Established in 1985, SAARC encourages co-operation in agriculture, rural development, science and technology, culture, health, population control, narcotics control and anti-terrorism.

SAARC has intentionally stressed these "core issues" and avoided more divisive political issues, although political dialogue is often conducted on the margins of SAARC meetings. In 1993, India and its SAARC partners signed an agreement to gradually lower tariffs within the region. Forward movement in SAARC has come to a standstill because of the tension between India and Pakistan, and the SAARC Summit originally scheduled for, but not held in, November 1999 has not been rescheduled. The Fourteenth SAARC Summit was held during 3–4 April 2007 in New Delhi. The 19th SAARC summit that was scheduled to be held in Islamabad was cancelled due to terrorist acts particularly Uri attack.

BIMSTEC
Bay of Bengal Initiative for Multi-Sectoral Technical and Economic Cooperation is now an "organization of member states" that are littorals of the Bay of Bengal or adjacent to it. The BIMSTEC member states – Bangladesh, Bhutan, India, Myanmar, Nepal, Sri Lanka, and Thailand – are among the major South and Southeast Asia countries dependent on the Bay of Bengal. India and some other countries, frustrated by the obstacles in SAARC's efforts to promote regional cooperation, have been working to make BIMSTEC the premier vehicle in this regard.

Southeast
Brunei

Brunei has a high commission in New Delhi, and India has a high commission in Bandar Seri Begawan. Both countries are full members of the Commonwealth of Nations.

Cambodia

Both nations have been in friendly relations.

Indonesia

The ties between Indonesia and India date back to the times of the Ramayana, "Yawadvipa" (Java) is mentioned in India's earliest epic, the Ramayana. Sugriva, the chief of Rama's army dispatched his men to Yawadvipa, the island of Java, in search of Sita. Indonesians had absorbed many aspects of Indian culture since almost two millennia ago. The most obvious trace is the large adoption of Sanskrit into Indonesian language. Several of Indonesian toponymy has Indian parallel or origin, such as Madura with Mathura, Serayu and Sarayu rivers, Kalingga from Kalinga Kingdom, and Ngayogyakarta from Ayodhya. Indianised Hindu–Buddhist kingdoms, such as Kalingga, Srivijaya, Mataram, Sunda, Kadiri, Singhasari and Majapahit were the predominant governments in Indonesia, and lasted from 200 to the 1500s, with the last remaining being in Bali. The example of profound Hindu-Buddhist influences in Indonesian history are the 9th century Prambanan and Borobudur temples.In 1950, the first President of Indonesia – Sukarno called upon the peoples of Indonesia and India to "intensify the cordial relations" that had existed between the two countries "for more than 1000 years" before they had been "disrupted" by colonial powers. In the spring of 1966, the foreign ministers of both countries began speaking again of an era of friendly relations. India had supported Indonesian independence and Nehru had raised the Indonesian question in the United Nations Security Council.

India has an embassy in Jakarta and Indonesia operates an embassy in Delhi. India regards Indonesia as a key member of ASEAN. Today, both countries maintain cooperative and friendly relations. India and Indonesia is one of the few (and also one of the largest) democracies in Asian region which can be projected as a real democracy. Both nations had agreed to establish a strategic partnership. As fellow Asian democracies that share common values, it is natural for both countries to nurture and foster strategic alliance. Indonesia and India are member states of the G-20, the E7, the Non-Aligned Movement, and the United Nations.

Laos

In recent years, India has endeavoured to build relations, with this small Southeast Asian nation. They have strong military relations, and India shall be building an Airforce Academy in Laos.

Malaysia

India has a high commission in Kuala Lumpur, and Malaysia has a high commission in New Delhi. Both countries are full members of the Commonwealth of Nations and the Asian Union. India and Malaysia are also connected by various cultural and historical ties that date back to antiquity. The two countries are on friendly terms with each other and Malaysia harbours a small population of Indian immigrants. Mahathir bin Mohamad the fourth and longest serving Prime Minister of Malaysia is of Indian origin. His father Mohamad Iskandar, is a Malayalee Muslim who migrated from Kerala and his mother Wan Tampawan, is a Malay.

Relations were escalated, when the Malaysian PM Mahathir Mohamad questioned the action of revocating the special status of Jammu and Kashmir, and on CAA-NRC protests. The relations continue to be diminished, also during the palm oil export from Malaysia to India.

Even with the new government in power, currently, there seems no recovery, as former Prime Minister Mahathir Mohamad still favored Pakistan.

Myanmar

India established diplomatic relations after Burma's independence from Great Britain in 1948. For many years, Indo-Burmese relations were strong due to cultural links, flourishing commerce, common interests in regional affairs and the presence of a significant Indian community in Burma. India provided considerable support when Myanmar struggled with regional insurgencies. However, the overthrow of the democratic government by the Military of Burma led to strains in ties. Along with much of the world, India condemned the suppression of democracy and Myanmar ordered the expulsion of the Burmese Indian community, increasing its own isolation from the world. Only China maintained close links with Myanmar while India supported the pro-democracy movement.

However, due to geo-political concerns, India revived its relations and recognised the military junta ruling Myanmar in 1993, overcoming strains over drug trafficking, the suppression of democracy and the rule of the military junta in Myanmar. Myanmar is situated to the south of the states of Mizoram, Manipur, Nagaland and Arunachal Pradesh in Northeast India. and the proximity of the People's Republic of China gives strategic importance to Indo-Burmese relations. The Indo-Burmese border stretches over 1,600 kilometers and some insurgents in North-east India seek refuge in Myanmar. Consequently, India has been keen on increasing military co-operation with Myanmar in its counter-insurgency activities. In 2001, the Indian Army completed the construction of a major road along its border with Myanmar. India has also been building major roads, highways, ports and pipelines within Myanmar in an attempt to increase its strategic influence in the region and also to counter China's growing strides in the Indochina peninsula. Indian companies have also sought active participation in oil and natural gas exploration in Myanmar. In February 2007, India announced a plan to develop the Sittwe port, which would enable ocean access from Indian Northeastern states like Mizoram, via the Kaladan River.

India is a major customer of Burmese oil and gas. In 2007, Indian exports to Myanmar totaled US$185 million, while its imports from Myanmar were valued at around US$810 million, consisting mostly of oil and gas. India has granted US$100 million credit to fund highway infrastructure projects in Myanmar, while US$57 million has been offered to upgrade Burmese railways. A further US$27 million in grants has been pledged for road and rail projects. India is one of the few countries that has provided military assistance to the Burmese junta. However, there has been increasing pressure on India to cut some of its military supplies to Burma. Relations between the two remain close which was evident in the aftermath of Cyclone Nargis, when India was one of the few countries whose relief and rescue aid proposals were accepted by Myanmar's ruling junta.

India maintain embassies in Rangoon and consulate-generals in Mandalay.

Philippines

Through the Srivijaya and Majapahit empires, Hindu influence has been visible in Philippine history from the 10th to 14th centuries. During the 18th century, there was robust trade between Manila with the Coromandel Coast and Bengal, involving Philippine exports of tobacco, silk, cotton, indigo, sugar cane and coffee.

Formal diplomatic relations between Philippines and India were established on 16 November 1949. The first Philippine envoy to India was the late Foreign Secretary Narciso Ramos. Seven years after India's independence in 1947, the Philippines and India signed a Treaty of Friendship on 11 July 1952 in Manila to strengthen the friendly relations existing between the two countries. Soon after, the Philippine Legation in New Delhi was established and then elevated to an embassy. However, due to foreign policy differences as a result of the bipolar alliance structure of the Cold War, the development of bilateral relations was stunted. It was only in 1976 that relations started to normalise when Aditya Birla, one of India's successful industrialists, met with then President Ferdinand E. Marcos to explore possibilities of setting up joint ventures in the Philippines.

Today, like India, the Philippines is the leading voice-operated business process outsourcing (BPO) source in terms of revenue (US$5.7) and number of people (500,000) employed in the sector. In partnership with the Philippines, India has 20 IT/BPO companies in the Philippines. Philippines-India bilateral trade stood at US$986.60 million in 2009. In 2004 it was US$600 million. Both countries aim to reach US$1 billion by 2010. There are 60,000 Indians living in the Philippines. The Philippines and India signed in October 2007 the Framework for Bilateral Cooperation which created the PH-India JCBC. It has working groups in trade, agriculture, tourism, health, renewable energy and a regular policy consultation mechanism and security dialogue.

Singapore

India and Singapore share long-standing cultural, commercial and strategic relations, with Singapore being a part of the "Greater India" cultural and commercial region. More than 300,000 people of Indian Tamil "தமிழ்" origin live in Singapore. Following its independence in 1965, Singapore was concerned with China-backed communist threats as well as domination from Malaysia and Indonesia and sought a close strategic relationship with India, which it saw as a counterbalance to Chinese influence and a partner in achieving regional security. Singapore had always been an important strategic trading post, giving India trade access to Maritime Southeast Asia and the Far East. Although the rival positions of both nations over the Vietnam War and the Cold War caused consternation between India and Singapore, their relationship expanded significantly in the 1990s; Singapore was one of the first to respond to Indian Look East policy of expanding its economic, cultural and strategic ties in Southeast Asia to strengthen its standing as a regional power. Singapore, and especially, the Singaporean Foreign Minister, George Yeo, have taken an interest, in re-establishing the ancient Indian university, Nalanda University.

Singapore is the 8th largest source of investment in India and the largest amongst ASEAN member nations. It is also India's 9th biggest trading partner as of 2005–06. Its cumulative investment in India totals US$3 billion as of 2006 and is expected to rise to US 5 billion by 2010 and US 10 billion by 2015. India's economic liberalisation and its "Look East" policy have led to a major expansion in bilateral trade, which grew from US$2.2 billion in 2001 to US 9–10 billion in 2006 – a 400% growth in span of five years – and to US$50 billion by 2010. Singapore accounts for 38% of India's trade with ASEAN member nations and 3.4% of its total foreign trade. India's main exports to Singapore in 2005 included petroleum, gemstones, jewellery, machinery and its imports from Singapore included electronic goods, organic chemicals and metals. More than half of Singapore's exports to India are basically "re-exports" – items that had been imported from India.

Thailand

India's Indian Look East policy, saw India grow relations with ASEAN countries including Thailand, and Thailand's Look West policy, also saw it grow its relations with India. Both countries are members of BIMSTEC. Indian Prime Ministers Rajiv Gandhi, P.V. Narasimha Rao, Atal Bihari Vajpayee, and Manmohan Singh, have visited Thailand, which were reciprocated by contemporary Thai Prime Ministers Chatichai Choonhavan, Thaksin Sinawatra, and Surayud Chulanont. In 2003, a Free Trade Agreement was signed between the two countries. India, is the 13th largest investor in Thailand. The spheres of trade are in chemicals, pharmaceuticals, textiles, nylon, tyre cord, real estate, rayon fibres, paper grade pulps, steel wires, and rods. However, IT services, and manufacturing, are the main spheres. Through Buddhism, India, has culturally influenced Thailand. The Indian epics, Mahabharata, and Ramayana, are popular and are widely taught in schools as part of the curriculum in Thailand. The example can also be seen in temples around Thailand, where the story of Ramayana and renowned Indian folk stories are depicted on the temple wall. Thailand, has become a big tourist destination for Indians.

Moreover, India and Thailand have been culturally linked for centuries and India has had a deep influence on Thai culture. There are a substantial number of words in Thai that are borrowed from Sanskrit, India's classical language. Pali, which was the language of Magadha and is medium of Theravada, is another important root of Thai vocabulary. Buddhism, the major religion of Thailand, itself originates from India. The Hindu story of Ramayana is also well known throughout Thailand in the name Ramakien.

Timor-Leste

Both nations have friendly and collateral relations.

Vietnam

India supported Vietnam's independence from France, opposed US involvement in the Vietnam War and supported unification of Vietnam. India established official diplomatic relations in 1972 and maintained friendly relations, especially in the wake of Vietnam's hostile relations with the People's Republic of China, which had become India's strategic rival.

India granted the "Most favoured nation" status to Vietnam in 1975 and both nations signed a bilateral trade agreement in 1978 and the Bilateral Investment Promotion and Protection Agreement (BIPPA) on 8 March 1997. In 2007, a fresh joint declaration was issued during the state visit of the Prime Minister of Vietnam Nguyen Tan Dung. Bilateral trade has increased rapidly since the liberalisation of the economies of both Vietnam and India. India is the 13th-largest exporter to Vietnam, with exports have grown steadily from US$11.5 million in 1985–86 to US$395.68 million by 2003. Vietnam's exports to India rose to US$180 million, including agricultural products, handicrafts, textiles, electronics and other goods. Between 2001 and 2006, the volume of bilateral trade expanded at 20–30% per annum to reach $1 billion by 2006. Continuing the rapid pace of growth, bilateral trade is expected to rise to $2 billion by 2008, two years ahead of the official target. India and Vietnam have also expanded co-operation in information technology, education and collaboration of the respective national space programmes. Direct air links and lax visa regulations have been established to bolster tourism.

India and Vietnam are members of the Mekong–Ganga Cooperation, created to develop to enhance close ties between India and nations of Southeast Asia. Vietnam has supported India's bid to become a permanent member of the United Nations Security Council and join the Indo-Pacific Economic Cooperation (APEC). In the 2003 joint declaration, India and Vietnam envisaged creating an "Arc of Advantage and Prosperity" in Southeast Asia; to this end, Vietnam has backed a more important relationship and role between India and the Association of Southeast Asian Nations (ASEAN) and its negotiation of an Indo–ASEAN free trade agreement. India and Vietnam have also built strategic partnerships, including extensive co-operation on developing nuclear power, enhancing regional security and fighting terrorism, transnational crime and drug trafficking.

ASEAN
India's interaction with ASEAN during the Cold War was very limited. India declined to get associated with ASEAN in the 1960s when full membership was offered even before the grouping was formed.

It is only with the formulation of the Look East policy in the last decade (1992), India had started giving this region due importance in the foreign policy. India became a sectoral dialogue partner with ASEAN in 1992, a full dialogue partner in 1995, a member of the ASEAN Regional Forum (ARF) in 1996, and a summit-level partner (on par with China, Japan and Korea) in 2002.

The first India–ASEAN Business Summit was held at New Delhi in October 2002. The then Prime Minister A. B. Vajpayee addressed this meet and since then this business summit has become an annual feature before the India–ASEAN Summits, as a forum for networking and exchange of business experiences between policy makers and business leaders from ASEAN and India.

Four India-ASEAN Summits, first in 2002 at Phnom Penh (Cambodia), second in 2003 at Bali, Indonesia, third in 2004 at Vientiane, Laos, and the fourth in 2005 at Kuala Lumpur, Malaysia, have taken place.

The following agreements have been entered into with ASEAN:
 Framework Agreement on Comprehensive Economic Cooperation (for establishing a FTA in a time frame of 10 years) was concluded in Bali in 2003.
 An ASEAN-India Joint Declaration for Cooperation to Combat International Terrorism has been adopted.
 India has acceded to the Treaty of Amity and Cooperation (TAC) in 2003, on which ASEAN was formed initially (in 1967).
 Agreement on "India-ASEAN Partnership for Peace, Progress and Shared Prosperity" was signed at the 3rd ASEAN-India Summit in November 2004.
 Setting up of Entrepreneurship Development Centres in ASEAN member states – Cambodia, Burma, Laos, and Vietnam. (The one in Laos is already functional)

The following proposals were announced by the Prime Minister at the 4th ASEAN-India Summit:
 Setting up centres for English Language Training (ELT) in Cambodia, Laos, Burma and Vietnam.
 Setting up a tele-medicine and tele-education network for Cambodia, Burma, Laos and Vietnam.
 Organising special training courses for diplomats from ASEAN countries.
 Organising an India-ASEAN Technology Summit in 2006.
 Organising education fairs and road shows in ASEAN countries.
 Conducting an India-ASEAN IT Ministerial and Industry Forum in 2006.

The ASEAN region has an abundance of natural resources and significant technological skills. These provide a natural base for the integration between ASEAN and India in both trade and investment. The present level of bilateral trade with ASEAN of nearly US$18 billion is reportedly increasing by about 25% per year. India hopes to reach the level of US$30 billion by 2007. India is also improving its relations with the help of other policy decisions like offers of lines of credit, better connectivity through air (open skies policy), rail and road links.

West
Armenia

India established diplomatic relations with Armenia in December 1992. It wasn't recognised by some countries including Pakistan, which most of the nations did. As of earliest days of silk route, there has been a strong cultural, moral and ancient other traditional relations among the nations. It fully supports India's bid for permanent seat in UNSC and even completely supports India on Kashmir conflicts. There exists a small community of Armenians in India while there is also a small community of Indians.

Azerbaijan

India has embassy in Baku and Azerbaijan has an embassy in New Delhi. Both have been connected through ancient cultural links and trade routes (especially the Silk Route).

Bahrain

India is a close ally of Bahrain, the Kingdom along with its GCC partners are (according to Indian officials) among the most prominent backers of India's bid for a permanent seat on the UN Security Council, and Bahraini officials have urged India to play a greater role in international affairs. For instance, over concerns about Iran's nuclear programme Bahrain's Crown Prince appealed to India to play an active role in resolving the crisis.

Ties between India and Bahrain go back generations, with many of Bahrain's most prominent figures having close connections: poet and constitutionalist Ebrahim Al-Arrayedh grew up in Bombay, while 17th century Bahraini theologians Sheikh Salih Al-Karzakani and Sheikh Ja'far bin Kamal al-Din were influential figures in the Kingdom of Golkonda and the development of Shia thought in the sub-continent.

Bahraini politicians have sought to enhance these long standing ties, with Parliamentary Speaker Khalifa Al Dhahrani in 2007 leading a delegation of parliamentarians and business leaders to meet the then Indian President Pratibha Patil, the then opposition leader L K Advani, and take part in training and media interviews. Politically, it is easier for Bahrain's politicians to seek training and advice from India than it is from the United States or other western alternative.

Adding further strength to the ties, Sheikh Hamad Bin Isa Al-Khalifa visited India during which MOUs and bilateral deals worth $450 million were approved. India expressed its support for Bahrain's bid for a non-permanent seat in the UNSC in 2026–27.

Cyprus

 Cyprus has a High Commission in New Delhi and 2 honorary consulates (in Mumbai and Kolkata).
 India has a High Commission in Nicosia.
 Both countries are full members of the Commonwealth of Nations.
 Cypriot Ministry of Foreign Affairs: list of bilateral treaties with India
India supported Cyprus during its struggle for independence from British colonial rule. India supported Greeks in Cyprus during the Turkish invasion of Cyprus in 1974, and lobbied for the international recognition of the Government of Nicosia as the sole legal representative of the entire nation. India has consistently supported and voted for a peaceful resolution of the Cyprus dispute at the United Nations.

Georgia

 Georgia has an embassy in New Delhi.
 India is represented in Georgia through its embassy in Yerevan (Armenia) and an honorary consulate in Tbilisi.
 Georgian Ministry of Foreign Affairs about relations with India

Iran

Independent India and Iran established diplomatic links on 15 March 1950. After the Iranian Revolution of 1979, Iran withdrew from CENTO and dissociated itself from US-friendly countries, including Pakistan, which automatically meant improved relationship with the Republic of India.

Currently, the two countries have friendly relations in many areas. There are significant trade ties, particularly in crude oil imports into India and diesel exports to Iran. Iran frequently objected to Pakistan's attempts to draft anti-India resolutions at international organisations such as the OIC. India welcomed Iran's inclusion as an observer state in the SAARC regional organisation. Lucknow continues to be a major centre of Shiite culture and Persian study in the subcontinent.

In the 1990s, India and Iran both supported the Northern Alliance in Afghanistan against the Taliban regime. They continue to collaborate in supporting the broad-based anti-Taliban government led by Hamid Karzai and backed by the United States.

However, one complex issue in Indo-Iran relations is the issue of Iran's nuclear programme. In this intricate issue, India tries to make a delicate balance. According to Rejaul Laskar, an Indian expert on international relations, "India's position on Iran's nuclear programme has been consistent, principled and balanced, and makes an endeavour to reconcile Iran's quest for energy security with the international community's concerns on proliferation. So, while India acknowledges and supports Iran's ambitions to achieve energy security and in particular, its quest for peaceful use of nuclear energy, it is also India's principled position that Iran must meet all its obligations under the international law, particularly its obligations under the nuclear Non Proliferation Treaty (NPT) and other such treaties to which it is a signatory"

Following an attack on an Israeli diplomat in India in February 2012, the Delhi Police contended that the Iranian Revolutionary Guard Corps had some involvement in the attack. This was subsequently confirmed in July 2012, after a report by the Delhi Police found evidence that members of Iranian Revolutionary Guard Corps had been involved in the 13 February bomb attack in the capital.

Iraq

Iraq was one of the few countries in the Middle East with which India established diplomatic relations at the embassy level immediately after its independence in 1947. Both nations signed the "Treaty of Perpetual Peace and Friendship" in 1952 and an agreement of co-operation on cultural affairs in 1954. India was amongst the first to recognise the Ba'ath Party-led government, and Iraq remained neutral during the Indo-Pakistani War of 1965. However, Iraq sided alongside other Persian Gulf states in supporting Pakistan against India during the Indo-Pakistani War of 1971, which saw the creation of Bangladesh. The eight-year-long Iran–Iraq War caused a steep decline in trade and commerce between the two nations.

During the 1991 Persian Gulf War, India remained neutral but permitted refuelling for US aircraft. It opposed UN sanctions on Iraq, but the period of war and Iraq's isolation further diminished India's commercial and diplomatic ties. From 1999 onwards, Iraq and India began to work towards a stronger relationship. Iraq had supported India's right to conduct nuclear tests following its tests of five nuclear weapons on 11 and 13 May 1998. In 2000, the then-Vice-President of Iraq Taha Yassin Ramadan visited India, and on 6 August 2002 President Saddam Hussein conveyed Iraq's "unwavering support" to India over the Kashmir conflict with Pakistan. India and Iraq established joint ministerial committees and trade delegations to promote extensive bilateral co-operation. Although initially disrupted during the 2003 invasion of Iraq, diplomatic and commercial ties between India and the new democratic government of Iraq have since been normalised.

Israel

The establishment of Israel at the end of World War II was a complex issue. Based on its own experience during partition, when 14 million people were displaced and an estimated 200,000 to 500,000 people were killed in Punjab Province, India had recommended a single state, as did Iran and Yugoslavia (later to undergo its own genocidal partition). The state could allocate Arab- and Jewish-majority provinces with a goal of preventing partition of historic Palestine and prevent widespread conflict. But, the final UN resolution recommended partition of Mandatory Palestine into Arab and Jewish states based on religious and ethnic majorities. India opposed this in the final vote as it did not agree with the concept of partition on the basis of religion.

Due to the security threat from a US-backed Pakistan and its nuclear programme in the 1980s, Israel and India started a clandestine relationship that involved co-operation between their respective intelligence agencies. Israel shared India's concerns about the growing danger posed by Pakistan and nuclear proliferation to Iran and other Arab states. Since the establishment of full diplomatic relations with Israel in 1992, India has improved its relation with the Jewish state. India is regarded as Israel's strongest ally in Asia, and Israel is India's second-largest arms supplier. Since India achieved its independence in 1947, it has supported Palestinian self-determination. India recognised Palestine's statehood following Palestine's declaration on 18 November 1988 and Indo-Palestinian relations were first established in 1974. This has not adversely affected India's improved relations with Israel.

India has entertained the Israeli Prime Minister in a visit in 2003, and Israel has entertained Indian dignitaries such as Finance Minister Jaswant Singh in diplomatic visits. India and Israel collaborate in scientific and technological endeavours. Israel's Minister for Science and Technology has expressed interest in collaborating with the Indian Space Research Organisation (ISRO) towards using satellites to better manage land and other resources. Israel has also expressed interest in participating in ISRO's Chandrayaan Mission involving an unmanned mission to the moon. On 21 January 2008, India successfully launched an Israeli spy satellite into orbit from Sriharikota space station in southern India. 

Israel and India share intelligence on terrorist groups. They have developed close defence and security ties since establishing diplomatic relations in 1992. India has bought more than $5 billion worth of Israeli equipment since 2002. In addition, Israel is training Indian military units and in 2008 was discussing an arrangement to give Indian commandos instruction in counter-terrorist tactics and urban warfare. In December 2008, Israel and India signed a memorandum to set up an Indo-Israel Legal Colloquium to facilitate discussions and exchange programmes between judges and jurists of the two countries.

Following the Israeli invasion of Lebanon in 2006, India stated that the Israeli use of force was "disproportionate and excessive".

India-Israel relationship has been very close and warm under the premiership of Narendra Modi since 2014. In 2017, he was the first ever Prime Minister of India to visit Israel.

Lebanon

India and Lebanon enjoy cordial and friendly relations based on many complementarities such as political system based on parliamentary democracy, non-alignment, human rights, commitment to a just world order, regional and global peace, liberal market economy and a vibrant entrepreneurial spirit. India has a peacekeeping force as part of the United Nations Interim Force in Lebanon (UNIFIL). One infantry battalion is deployed in Lebanon and about 900 personnel are stationed in the Eastern part of Southern Lebanon. The force also provided non-patrol aid to citizens.
India and Lebanon have very good relations since the 1950s.

Oman

India–Oman relations are foreign relations between India and the Sultanate of Oman. India has an embassy in Muscat, Oman. The Indian consulate was opened in Muscat in February 1955 and five years later it was upgraded to a consulate general and later developed into a full-fledged embassy in 1971. The first Ambassador of India arrived in Muscat in 1973. Oman established its embassy in New Delhi in 1972 and a consulate general in Mumbai in 1976.

$5.6 bn Oman-India energy pipeline plans progressing: Fox Petroleum Group envisions a roughly five-year timeframe for the execution of the pipeline project.

Ajay Kumar, the chairman and managing director of Fox Petroleum, based in New Delhi, which is an associate company of Fox Petroleum FZC in the UAE, said that Mr. Modi had "fired the best weapon of economic development and growth". "He has given a red carpet for global players to invest in India," Mr. Kumar added. "It will boost all sectors of industry – especially for small-scale manufacturing units and heavy industries too."

     

Saudi Arabia

Bilateral relations between India and the Saudi Arabia have strengthened considerably owing to co-operation in regional affairs and trade. Saudi Arabia is the one of largest suppliers of oil to India, who is one of the top seven trading partners and the 5th biggest investor in Saudi Arabia.

India was one of the first nations to establish ties with the Third Saudi State. During the 1930s, India heavily funded Nejd through financial subsidies.

India's strategic relations with Saudi Arabia have been affected by the latter's close ties with Pakistan. Saudi Arabia supported Pakistan's stance on the Kashmir conflict and during the Indo-Pakistani War of 1971 at the expense of its relations with India. The Soviet Union's close relations with India also served as a source of consternation. During the Persian Gulf War (1990–91), India officially maintained neutrality. Saudi Arabia's close military and strategic ties with Pakistan have also been a source of continuing strain.

Since the 1990s, both nations have taken steps to improve ties. Saudi Arabia has supported granting observer status to India in the Organisation of Islamic Cooperation (OIC) and has expanded its co-operation with India to fight terrorism. In January 2006, King Abdullah of Saudi Arabia made a special visit to India, becoming the first Saudi monarch in 51 years to do so. The Saudi king and former Prime Minister of India Manmohan Singh signed an agreement forging a strategic energy partnership that was termed the "Delhi Declaration". The pact provides for a "reliable, stable and increased volume of crude oil supplies to India through long-term contracts." Both nations also agreed on joint ventures and the development of oil and natural gas in public and private sectors. An Indo-Saudi joint declaration in the Indian capital New Delhi described the king's visit as "heralding a new era in India-Saudi Arabia relations".

Syria

Bilateral relations between the India and Syria are historic where the two have ancient civilizational ties. Both countries were on the Silk Road through which civilizational exchanges took place for centuries. The Syriac Christianity, originating in ancient Syria, spread further to the East and created the first Christian communities in ancient India. The ancient Syriac language among the Syrian Christians of Kerala was also brought to Kerala by St Thomas in the 1st century CE. Even today the language continues to be taught in colleges and universities in Kerala.

A common nationalism and secular orientation, membership of NAM and similar perceptions on many issues further strengthened a bond between the two states. India supported "Syria's legitimate right to regain the occupied Golan Heights". In turn, this was reciprocated with Syrian recognition that Kashmir is a bilateral issue as well as general support of India's concerns and even candidature at various international forums.

Turkey

Due to controversial issues such as Turkey's close relationship with Pakistan, relations between the two countries have often been blistered at certain times, but better at others. India and Turkey's relationship alters from unsureness to collaboration when the two nations work together to combat terrorism in Central and South Asia, and the Middle East. India and Turkey are also connected by history, seeing as they have known each other since the days of the Ottoman Empire, and seeing as India was one of the countries to send aid to Turkey following its war of independence. The Indian real estate firm GMR, has invested in and is working towards the modernisation of Istanbul's Sabiha Gökçen International Airport.

The relations took a nose-dive after Turkish president Recep Tayyip Erdoğan spoke against of India on Kashmir issue and supported Pakistan, during his address at United Nations General Assembly after Pakistan PM Imran Khan, in September 2019. In February 2020, he visited Islamabad and held talks with Imran Khan, on "improving and bolding the relations with Islamabad". At the end of the month, during the riots of Delhi and CAA-NRC protests in India, he criticized the government for its policies. He also had criticized the move of Indian Government on the Galwan Valley skirmishes with China on LAC.

United Arab Emirates

India–United Arab Emirates relations refers to the bilateral relations that exist between the Republic of India and the United Arab Emirates. After the creation of the Federation in 1971, India-UAE relations flourished. Today UAE and India share political, economical and cultural links. There are over a million Indians in the United Arab Emirates, being by far the largest migrant group in the country.[1] A large Indian expatriate community resides and engages in the UAE in economically productive activities and has played a significant role in the evolution of the UAE. In 2008–09, India emerged as the largest trade partner of the UAE with bilateral trade between the two countries exceeding US$44.5 billion. [9] UAE and India are each other's main trading partners. The trade totals over $75 billion (AED275.25 billion).

Arab states of the Persian Gulf

India and the Arab states of the Persian Gulf enjoy strong cultural and economic ties. This is reflected in the fact that more than 50% of the oil consumed by India comes from the Persian Gulf countries and Indian nationals form the largest expatriate community in the Arabian peninsula. The annual remittance by Indian expatriates in the region amounted to US$20 billion in 2007. India is one of the largest trading partners of the CCASG with non-oil trade between India and Dubai alone amounting to US$19 billion in 2007. The Persian Gulf countries have also played an important role in addressing India's energy security concerns, with Saudi Arabia and Kuwait regularly increasing their oil supply to India to meet the country's rising energy demand. In 2005, Kuwait increased its oil exports to India by 10% increasing the net oil trade between the two to US$4.5 billion. In 2008, Qatar decided to invest US$5 billion in India's energy sector.

India has maritime security arrangement in place with Oman and Qatar. In 2008, a landmark defence pact was signed, under which India committed its military assets to protect "Qatar from external threats".
There has been progress in a proposed deep-sea gas pipeline from Qatar, via Oman, to India.

Europe
Albania

Austria

Austria–India relations refers to the bilateral ties between Austria and India. Indo-Austrian relations were established in May 1949 by the first Prime Minister of India Jawaharlal Nehru and the Chancellor of Austria Leopold Figl. Historically, Indo-Austrian ties have been particularly strong and India intervened in June 1953 in Austria's favour whilst negotiations were going on with Soviet Union about the Austrian State Treaty. There is a fully functioning Indian embassy in Vienna, Austria's capital, which is concurrently accredited to the United Nations offices in the city. Austria is represented in India by its embassy and Trade commission in New Delhi, India's capital, as well as honorary consulates in Mumbai, Kolkata, Chennai and Goa.

Belarus

Belarus has an embassy in New Delhi. Since 14 May 1992, India has an embassy in Minsk.

Belgium

Belgium has an embassy in New Delhi, consulates in Chennai and Mumbai, and an honorary consulate in Kolkata. 
India has an embassy in Brussels.

Bosnia and Herzegovina

Bulgaria

Bulgaria has an embassy in New Delhi and an honorary consulate in Kolkata. India has an embassy in Sofia.

Croatia

Since February 1995, Croatia has an embassy in New Delhi and an honorary consulate in Mumbai. Since 28 April 1996, India has an embassy in Zagreb.

Czech Republic

Czech-Indian relations were established in 1921 by a consulate in Bombay. The Czech Republic has an embassy in New Delhi. Consulates of Czech Republic in India are in Chennai, Mumbai and Kolkata. India has an embassy in Prague.

Denmark

Denmark has an embassy in New Delhi, and India has an embassy in Copenhagen.

Tranquebar, a town in the southern Indian state of Tamil Nadu, was a Danish colony in India from 1620 to 1845. It is spelled Trankebar or Tranquebar in Danish, which comes from the native Tamil, Tarangambadi, meaning "place of the singing waves". It was sold, along with the other Danish settlements in mainland India, most notably Serampore (now in West Bengal), to Great Britain in 1845. The Nicobar Islands were also colonised by Denmark, until sold to the British in 1868, who made them part of the British Indian Empire.

After Independence in 1947, Indian prime minister Jawaharlal Nehru's visit to Denmark in 1957 laid the foundation for a friendly relationship between India and Denmark that has endured ever since. The bilateral relations between India and Denmark are cordial and friendly, based on synergies in political, economic, academic and research fields. There have been periodic high level visits between the two countries.

Anders Fogh Rasmussen, former Prime Minister of Denmark, accompanied by a large business delegation, paid a state visit to India from 4 to 8 February 2008. He visited Infosys, Biocon and IIM Bangalore in Bangalore and Agra. He launched an 'India Action Plan', which called for strengthening of the political dialogue, strengthening of co-operation in trade and investments, research in science and technology, energy, climate and environment, culture, education, student exchanges and attracting skilled manpower and IT experts to Denmark for short periods. The two countries signed an Agreement for establishment of a Bilateral Joint Commission for Cooperation.

In July 2012, the Government of India decided to scale down its diplomatic ties with Denmark after that country's refusal to appeal in their Supreme Court against a decision of its lower court rejecting the extradition of Purulia arms drop case prime accused Kim Davy a.k.a. Niels Holck. Agitated over Denmark's refusal to act on India's repeated requests to appeal in their apex court to facilitate Davy's extradition to India, government issued a circular directing all senior officials not to meet or entertain any Danish diplomat posted in India.

Estonia

India's first recognition of Estonia came on 22 September 1921 when the former had just acquired membership in the League of Nations. India re-recognised Estonia on 9 September 1991 and diplomatic relations were established on 2 December of the same year in Helsinki. Neither country has a resident ambassador. Estonia is represented in India by and an Embassy in New Delhi one honorary consulate in Mumbai . India is represented in Estonia through its embassy in Helsinki (Finland) and through an honorary consulate in Tallinn.

France

France and India established diplomatic relationships soon after India's independence from the British Empire in 1947. France's Indian possessions were returned to India after a treaty of cession was signed by the two countries in May 1956. On 16 August 1962, India and France exchanged the instruments of ratification under which France ceded to India full sovereignty over the territories it held. Pondicherry and the other enclaves of Karaikal, Mahe and Yanam came to be administered as the Union Territory of Puducherry from 1 July 1963.

France, Russia and Israel were the only countries that did not condemn India's decision to go nuclear in 1998. In 2003, France became the largest supplier of nuclear fuel and technology to India and remains a large military and economic trade partner. India's candidacy for permanent membership in the UN Security Council has found very strong support from former French President Nicolas Sarkozy. The Indian Government's decisions to purchase French s worth US$3 billion and 43 Airbus aircraft for Air India worth US$2.5 billion have further cemented the strategic, military and economic co-operation between India and France.

France's decision to ban schoolchildren from wearing of head-dresses and veils had the unintended consequence of affecting Sikh children who have been refused entry in public schools. The Indian Government, citing historic traditions of the Sikh community, has requested French authorities to review the situation so as to not to exclude Sikh children from education.

President Nicolas Sarkozy and François Hollande visited India in January 2008 and 2016 respectively as the Chief Guest of the annual Republic Day parade in New Delhi. France was the first country to sign a nuclear energy co-operation agreement with India; this was done during Prime Minister Singh's visit, following the waiver by the Nuclear Suppliers Group. During the Bastille Day celebrations on 14 July 2009, a detachment of 400 Indian troops marched alongside the French troops and the then Indian Prime Minister Manmohan Singh was the guest of honour.

Finland

India has an embassy in Helsinki. Finland has an embassy in New Delhi and three honorary consulates in Kolkata, Chennai, and Mumbai.

Germany

During the Cold War India maintained diplomatic relations with both West Germany and East Germany. Since the fall of the Berlin Wall, and the reunification of Germany, relations have further improved.

Germany is India's largest trade partner in Europe. Between 2004 and 2013, Indo-German trade grew in volume but dropped in importance. According to Indian Ministry of Commerce MX data: Total trade between India and Germany was $5.5billion (3.8% share of Indian trade and ranked 6) in 2004 and $21.6billion (2.6% share of Indian trade and ranked 9) in 2013. Indian exports to Germany were $2.54billion (3.99% ranked 6) in 2004 and $7.3billion (2.41% ranked 10) in 2013. Indian imports from Germany were $2.92billion (3.73% ranked 6) in 2004 and $14.33billion (2.92% ranked 10) in 2013.

Indo-German ties are transactional. The strategic relationship between Germany and India suffers from sustained anti-Asian sentiment,  institutionalized discrimination against minority groups, and xenophobic incidents against Indians in Germany. The 2007 Mügeln mob attack on Indians and the 2015 Leipzig University internship controversy has clouded the predominantly commercial-oriented relationship between the two countries. Stiff competition between foreign manufactured goods within the Indian market has seen machine-tools, automotive parts and medical supplies from German Mittelstand ceding ground to high-technology imports manufactured by companies located in ASEAN & BRICS countries. The Volkswagen emissions scandal drew the spotlight to corrupt behaviour in German boardrooms and brought back memories of the HDW bribery scandal surrounding the procurement of s by the Indian Navy. The India-Germany strategic relationship is limited by the insignificance of German geopolitical influence in Asian affairs. Germany has no strategic footprint in Asia. Germany like India is working towards gaining permanent seats in the United Nations Security Council.

Greece

For the Ancient Greeks "India" (Greek: Ινδία) meant only the upper Indus until the time of Alexander the Great. Afterwards, "India" meant to the Greeks most of the northern half of the Indian subcontinent. The Greeks referred to the Indians as "Indói" (Greek: Ἰνδοί), literally meaning "the people of the Indus River". Indians called the Greeks Yonas or "Yavanas" from Ionians.
Indo-Greek kingdoms were founded by the successor of Alexander the Great. (Greek conquests in India)
The Periplus of the Erythraean Sea was a manual written in Greek for navigators who carried trade between Roman Empire and other regions, including ancient India. It gives detailed information about the ports, routes and commodities. The Greek ethnographer and explorer of the Hellenistic period, Megasthenes was the ambassador of Seleucus I at India. In his work, Indika (Greek: Ινδικά), he wrote the history of Indians and their culture. Megasthenes also mentioned the prehistoric arrival of God Dionysus and Herakles (Megasthenes' Herakles) in India.

There is now tangible evidence indicating that the settlement of Greek merchants in Bengal must have begun as early as the beginning of the seventeenth century. Dimitrios Galanos (Greek: Δημήτριος Γαλανός, 1760–1833) was the earliest recorded Greek Indologist. His translations of Sanskrit texts into Greek made knowledge of the philosophical and religious ideas of India available to many Europeans. A "Dimitrios Galanos" Chair for Hellenic Studies was established at Jawaharlal Nehru University in New Delhi, India in September 2000.

In modern time, diplomatic relations between Greece and India were established in May 1950. The new Greek Embassy building in New Delhi was inaugurated on 6 February 2001.  As of 2020, the relation between the two countries is closer than ever and is considered historical and strategic by both parts.

Hungary

Indian embassy is located in Budapest.

Iceland

Iceland and India established diplomatic relations in 1972. The Embassy of Iceland in London was accredited to India and the Embassy of India in Oslo, Norway, was accredited to Iceland. However, it was only after 2003 that the two countries began close diplomatic and economic relationships. In 2003, President of Iceland Ólafur Ragnar Grímsson visited India on a diplomatic mission. This was the first visit by an Icelandic President to India. During the visit, Iceland pledged support to New Delhi's candidature for a permanent seat in the United Nation Security Council thus becoming the first Nordic country to do so. This was followed by an official visit of President of India A. P. J. Abdul Kalam to Iceland in May 2005. Following this a new embassy of Iceland was opened in New Delhi on 26 February 2006. Soon, an Indian Navy team visited Iceland on friendly mission. Gunnar Pálsson is the ambassador of Iceland to India. The Embassy's area of accreditation, apart from India includes Bangladesh, Indonesia, the Seychelles, Singapore, Sri Lanka, Malaysia, Maldives, Mauritius and Nepal. India appointed S. Swaminathan as the first resident ambassador to Iceland in March 2008.
 India has an embassy established in 2006 at Reykjavík.
 Iceland has an embassy established in 2005 at New Delhi.

Ireland

Indo-Irish relations picked up steam during their respective campaigns for independence from the British Empire. Political relations between the two states have largely been based on socio-cultural ties, although political and economic ties have also helped build relations. Indo-Irish relations were greatly strengthened by Pandit Nehru, Éamon de Valera, Rabindranath Tagore, W. B. Yeats, James Joyce, and, above all, Annie Besant. Politically, relations have not been cold or warm. Mutual benefit has led to economic ties that are fruitful for both states. Visits by government leaders have kept relations cordial at regular intervals.

 India has an embassy in Dublin.
 Republic of Ireland has an embassy in New Delhi.

Italy

India maintains an embassy in Rome, and a consulate-general in Milan. Italy has an embassy in New Delhi, and consulate-generals in Mumbai and Calcutta.

Indo-Italian relations have historically been cordial. In recent times, their state has mirrored the political fortunes of Sonia Maino-Gandhi, the Italian-born leader of the Indian National Congress and de facto leader of the UPA government of Manmohan Singh.

Since 2012 the relationship has been affected by the ongoing Enrica Lexie case: two Indian fishermen were killed on the Indian fishing vessel St. Antony as a result of gunshot wounds following a confrontation with the Italian oil tanker Enrica Lexie in international waters, off the Kerala coast.

After a period of tensions, in 2017 Italian Prime Minister Paolo Gentiloni visited India and met his Indian counterpart Narendra Modi; they held extensive talks in order to strengthen the political cooperation and to boost the bilateral trade.

There are around 150,000 people of Indian Origins living in Italy. Around 1,000 Italian citizens reside in India, mostly working on behalf of Italian industrial groups.

Lithuania

Luxembourg

Relations were established in 1947, following India's independence. Luxembourg operates an Embassy in New Delhi whilst India operates a Consulate General in Luxembourg City. Bilateral Trade stood at US$37 Million in 2014 and trade continues to grow every year. Diplomats from both countries have visited the other several time. In 2019, Luxembourg plans to host the annual Asian Infrastructure Investment Bank and open an economic mission in India.

Malta

Malta opened a High Commission of Malta, New Delhi in New Delhi in 2007. Malta also has an honorary consulate in Mumbai. India is represented in Malta by its high commission in Valletta.

Moldova

The Indian embassy to Moldova is accredited from Bucharest, Romania. Moldova maintains an honorary consulate in New Delhi and a consulate in Mumbai.
Both countries have taken steps to deepen their ties, which is still maintained in a modest level. Both countries have been found supporting each other at many international platforms like the United Nations through reciprocal support mechanism. India-Moldova bilateral trade has been rather modest.

Monaco

Netherlands

India–Netherlands relations refer to foreign relations between India and the Netherlands. India maintains an embassy in The Hague, Netherlands and the Netherlands maintains an embassy in New Delhi and a consulate general in Mumbai. Both countries established diplomatic relations in 1947.

Norway

In 2012, Trond Giske met with Minister of Finance Pranab Mukherjee, to save Telenor's investments to put forth Norway's "strong wish" that there must not be a waiting period between the confiscation of telecom licenses and the re-sale of those. The leader of Telenor attended the meeting.

North Macedonia

Mother Teresa, honoured in the Catholic Church as Saint Teresa of Calcutta became an Indian citizen in 1951, was born in Skopje (in present-day North Macedonia) in 1910. India has embassy in Sofia, Bulgaria jointly accredited to Republic of Macedonia. Both Macedonia has embassy in New Delhi and honorary consulate in Kolkata, Mumbai, Chennai and Bangalore.

Poland

Historically, relations have generally been close and friendly, characterised by understanding and co-operation on international front.
 India has an embassy in Warsaw.
 Poland has an embassy in New Delhi.

Portugal

India and Portugal have a long history of relations ever since the Portuguese colonisation in British Raj.

Russia

India's ties with the Russian Federation are time-tested and based on continuity, trust and mutual understanding. There is national consensus in both the countries on the need to preserve and strengthen India-Russia relations and further consolidate the strategic partnership between the two countries. A Declaration on Strategic Partnership was signed between present Russian President Vladimir Putin and former Indian Prime Minister Atal Bihari Vajpayee in October 2000 the partnership is also referred as  "special and privileged strategic partnership" .

Russia and India have decided not to renew the 1971 Indo-Soviet Peace and Friendship Treaty and have sought to follow what both describe as a more pragmatic, less ideological relationship. Russian President Yeltsin's visit to India in January 1993 helped cement this new relationship. Ties have grown stronger with President Vladimir Putin's 2004 visit. The pace of high-level visits has since increased, as has discussion of major defence purchases. Russia, is working for the development of the Kudankulam Nuclear Power Plant, that will be capable of producing 1000 MW of electricity. Gazprom, is working for the development of oil and natural gas, in the Bay of Bengal. India and Russia, have collaborated extensively, on space technology. Other areas of collaboration include software, Ayurveda, etc. India and Russia, have set a determination in increasing trade to $10 billion. Cooperation between clothing manufacturers of the two countries continues to strengthen. India and Russia signed an agreement on joint efforts to increase investment and trade volumes in the textile industry in both countries. In signing the document included representatives of the Russian Union of Entrepreneurs of Textile and Light Industry Council and apparel exports of India (AEPC). A co-operation agreement provides, inter alia, exchange of technology and know-how in textile production. For this purpose, a special Commission on Affairs textile (Textile Communication Committee). Counter-terrorism techniques are also in place between Russia and India. In 2007 President Vladimir Putin was guest of honour at Republic Day celebration on 26 January 2007. 2008, has been declared by both countries as the Russia-India Friendship Year. Bollywood films are quite popular in Russia. The Indian public sector oil company ONGC bought Imperial Energy Corporation in 2008. In December 2008, during President Medvedev's visit, to New Delhi, India and Russia, signed a nuclear energy co-operation agreement. In March 2010, Russian Prime Minister Vladimir Putin signed an additional 19 pacts with India which included civilian nuclear energy, space and military co-operation and the final sale of Admiral Gorshkov (Aircraft Carrier) along with MiG-29K fighter jets.

During the 2014 Crimean crisis India refused to support American sanctions against Russia and one of India's national security advisers Shivshankar Menon was reported to have said "There are legitimate Russian and other interests involved and we hope they are discussed and resolved."

On 7 August 2014 India and Russia held a joint counter-terrorism exercise near Moscow boundary with China and Mongolia. It involved the use of tanks and armoured vehicles.

India and Russia have so far conducted three rounds of INDRA exercises. The first exercise was carried out in 2005 in Rajasthan, followed by Prshkov in Russia. The third exercise was conducted at Chaubattia in Kumaon hills in October 2010.

Romania

India has an embassy in Bucharest and an honorary consulate in Timișoara. Romania has an embassy in New Delhi and an honorary consulate in Kolkata.

Serbia

 India has an embassy in Belgrade.
 Serbia has an embassy in New Delhi and an honorary consulate in Chennai.
 The relations are seen as one of the closest for both nations.

Slovakia

India has an embassy in Bratislava and Slovakia has an embassy in New Delhi.

Slovenia

 India has an embassy in Ljubljana.
 Slovenia has an embassy in New Delhi.

Spain

Diplomatic ties with Spain started in 1956. The first Spanish embassy was established in Delhi in 1958. India and Spain have had cordial relationship with each other especially after the establishment of democracy in Spain in 1978. Spain has been a main tourist spot for Indians over the years. Many presidents including Prathibha Patil visited Spain. The royal family of Spain have always liked the humble nature of the Indian government and they have thus paid several visits to India. There was no direct flight from India to Spain but it all changed in 1986 when Iberian travels started to fly directly from Mumbai to Madrid. However, it was stopped in 22 months. In 2006 this issue of direct flight was reconsidered so as to improve the ties between India and Spain. "Zindagi Na Milegi Dobara" was shot completely in Spain in 2011. The tourism ministry of Spain are using this movie to promote tourism to Spain in India.

Sweden

India has an embassy in Stockholm, which is also accredited to Latvia.
Sweden has an embassy in New Delhi, which is also accredited to Sri Lanka, Nepal, Bhutan and the Maldives. It has three honorary consulates in Chennai, Kolkata and Mumbai.

Switzerland

 Switzerland has an embassy in New Delhi and a consulate in Bangalore and Mumbai.
 India has an embassy in Bern and consulates in Geneva and Zurich.
India is one of Switzerland's most important partners in Asia. Bilateral and political contacts are constantly developing, and trade and scientific co-operation between the two countries are flourishing. Switzerland was the first country in the World to sign a Friendship treaty with India in 1947.

Ukraine

Diplomatic relations between India and Ukraine were established in January 1992. The Indian Embassy in Kyiv was opened in May 1992 and Ukraine opened its mission in New Delhi in February 1993. The Consulate General of India in Odessa functioned from 1962 until its closure in March 1999.
 India has an embassy in Kyiv.
 Ukraine has an embassy in New Delhi and an honorary consulate in Mumbai.

United Kingdom

UK& India has a high commission in London and two consulates-general in Birmingham and Edinburgh. The United Kingdom has a high commission in New Delhi and five deputy high commissions in Mumbai, Chennai, Bangalore, Hyderabad and Kolkata. Since 1947, India's relations with the United Kingdom have been through bilateral, as well as through the Commonwealth of Nations framework. Although the Sterling Area no longer exists and the Commonwealth is much more an informal forum, India and the UK still have many enduring links. This is in part due to the significant number of people of Indian origin living in the UK. The large South Asian population in the UK results in steady travel and communication between the two countries. The British Raj allowed for both cultures to imbibe tremendously from the other. The English language and cricket are perhaps the two most evident British exports, whilst in the UK food from the Indian subcontinent is very popular. The United Kingdom's favourite food is often reported to be Indian cuisine, although no official study reports this.

Economically the relationship between Britain and India is also strong. India is the second largest investor in Britain after the US. Britain is also one of the largest investors in India.

Vatican City & the Holy See

Formal bilateral relations between India and the Vatican City have existed since 12 June 1948. An Apostolic Delegation existed in India from 1881. The Holy See has a nunciature in New Delhi whilst India has accredited its embassy in Bern, Switzerland to the Holy See as well. India's Ambassador in Bern has traditionally been accredited to the Holy See.

The connections between the Catholic Church and India can be traced back to the apostle St. Thomas, who, according to tradition, came to India in 52 CE in the 9th century, the patriarch of the Nestorians in Persia sent bishops to India. There is a record of an Indian bishop visiting Rome in the early part of the 12th century.

The diplomatic mission was established as the Apostolic Delegation to the East Indies in 1881, and included Ceylon, and was extended to Malaca in 1889, and then to Burma in 1920, and eventually included Goa in 1923. It was raised to an Internunciature by Pope Pius XII on 12 June 1948 and to a full Apostolic Nunciature by Pope Paul VI on 22 August 1967.

There have been three Papal visits to India. The first Pope to visit India was Pope Paul VI, who visited Mumbai in 1964 to attend the Eucharistic Congress. Pope John Paul II visited India in February 1986 and November 1999. Several Indian dignitaries have, from time to time, called on the Pope in the Vatican. These include Prime Minister Indira Gandhi in 1981 and Prime Minister I. K. Gujral in September 1987. Atal Bihari Vajpayee, Prime Minister, called on the Pope in June
2000 during his official visit to Italy. Vice-President Bhairon Singh Shekhawat represented the country at the funeral of Pope John Paul II.

European Union

India was one of the first countries to develop relations with the European Union. The Joint Political Statement of 1993 and the 1994 Co-operation Agreement were the foundational agreements for the bilateral partnership. In 2004, India and European Union became "Strategic Partners". A Joint Action Plan was agreed upon in 2005 and updated in 2008. India-EU Joint Statements was published in 2009 and 2012 following the India-European Union Summits.

India and the European Commission initiated negotiations on a Broad-based Trade and Investment Agreement (BTIA) in 2007. Seven rounds of negotiations have been completed without reaching a Free Trade Agreement.

According to the Government of India, trade between India and the EU was $57.25 billion between April and October 2014 and stood at $101.5 billion for the fiscal period of 2014–2015.

The European Union is India's second largest trade bloc, accounting for around 20% of Indian trade (Gulf Cooperation Council is the largest trade bloc with almost $160 billion in total trade). India was the European Union's 8th largest trading partner in 2010. EU-India trade grew from €28.6 billion in 2003 to €72.7 billion in 2013.

France, Germany and UK collectively represent the major part of EU-India trade. Annual trade in commercial services tripled from €5.2billion in 2002 to €17.9 billion in 2010. 
Denmark, Sweden, Finland and the Netherlands are the other more prominent European Union countries who trade with India.

Oceania
Australia

India & Australia are both Commonwealth members. Sporting and cultural ties are significant. Australian cricketers often undertake large commercial ventures in India, enhanced with the IPL, and, to a lesser degree, the ICL. Bollywood productions enjoy a large market in Australia. In 2007, PM John Howard visited Mumbai and its entertainment industry, in efforts to increase Tourism in India to Australia.

There are ongoing strategic attempts to form an "Asian NATO" with India, Japan, the US and Australia through the Quadrilateral Security Dialogue. During the first decade of the 21st century, the deepening of strategic relations between the two nations was prevented by a range of policy disagreements, such as India's refusal to sign the NPT and Australia's consequent refusal to provide India with uranium. Australia's parliament later allowed for the sale of uranium to India, following changes in government. Closer strategic cooperation between India, Japan, the United States and Australia also began during the second half of the 2010s, which some analysts attributed to a desire to balance Chinese initiatives in the Indo-Pacific region.

Cook Islands

Fiji

Fiji's relationship with the Republic of India is often seen by observers against the backdrop of the sometimes tense relations between its indigenous people and the 44 percent of the population who are of Indian descent. India has used its influence in international forums such as the Commonwealth of Nations and United Nations on behalf of ethnic Indians in Fiji, lobbying for sanctions against Fiji in the wake of the 1987 coups and the 2000 coup, both of which removed governments, one dominated and one led, by Indo-Fijians.

Kiribati

Marshall Islands

Micronesia

Nauru

India and Nauru relations have been established since the island nation's independence in 1968. Leaders of both countries have been meeting on the sidelines of some of the international forums of which both the nations are part of such as the United Nations and the Non-Aligned Movement. India is one of the largest donors to the island by improving the education ministry and creating transportation and computer connections for the MPs and the Speaker of the Parliament of Nauru. There were numerous visits by the President of Nauru to the republic for further strengthen in ties and co-operation.

New Zealand

Bilateral relations were established between India and New Zealand in 1952. India has a High Commission in Wellington with an Honorary Consulate in Auckland, while New Zealand has a High Commission in New Delhi along with a Consulate in Mumbai, trade offices in New Delhi and Mumbai and an Honorary Consulate in Chennai.

India–New Zealand relations were cordial but not extensive after Indian independence.  More recently, New Zealand has shown interest in extending ties with India due to India's impressive GDP growth.

Niue

Palau

Papua New Guinea

India and Papua New Guinea established relations in 1975, following PNG's independence from Australia. Since 1975, relations have grown between the two nations. India maintains a High Commission in Port Moresby while Papua New Guinea maintains a High Commission in New Delhi In the 2010 Fiscal Year, Trade between the two nations grew to US$239 Million. PNG has sent numerous military officers and students to be trained and educated in India's academies and universities respectively. In recent years, India and PNG have signed an Economic Partnership Agreement, allowing India to further invest into PNG's infrastructure, telecommunications and educational institutions.

Samoa

Both countries established diplomatic relations in June 1970.

Solomon Islands

Tonga

Tuvalu

Vanuatu
India has its High Commission in Wellington, New Zealand, accredited to Vanuatu.

De Facto

Kosovo

Since its declaration of independence from Serbia, Kosovo sought recognition from the major of the world's most influential countries, and among them, India. Indian views regarding the developments followed initial constringent to comment, but apparently dismissed to give recognition of a statehood. There are almost negligible interactions.

Palestine

After India achieved its independence in 1947, the country has moved to support Palestinian self-determination following the partition of India. In the light of a religious partition between India and Pakistan, the impetus to boost ties with Muslim states around the world was a further tie to India's support for the Palestinian cause. Though it started to waver in the late 1980s and 1990s as the recognition of Israel led to diplomatic exchanges, the ultimate support for the Palestinian cause was still an underlying concern.
Beyond the recognition for Palestinian self-determination ties have been largely dependent upon socio-cultural bonds, while economic relations were neither cold nor warm.

India recognised Palestine's statehood following its own declaration on 18 November 1988; although relations were first established in 1974.

PNA President Abbas paid a State visit to India in September 2012, during which India pledged $10 million as aid. Indian officials said it was the third such donation, adding that New Delhi was committed to helping other development projects. India also pledged support to Palestine's bid for full and equal membership of the UN.

Taiwan

India recognized the Republic of China (R.O.C) from 1947 to 1950. On 1 April 1950, India officially recognised the People's Republic of China (P.R.C) as "China" and continued to recognise the PRC's "One China" policy in which island of Taiwan is a part of the Chinese territory. However, the bilateral relations between India and Taiwan have improved since the 1990s despite both nations not maintaining official diplomatic relations. Taiwan and India maintains non-governmental interaction via India-Taipei Association and via Taipei Economic and Cultural Centre respectively. In July 2020, the Indian government appointed a top career diplomat, Joint Secretary Gourangalal Das, the former head of the U.S. division in India's Ministry of External Affairs, as its new envoy to Taiwan.

International organizations
India participates in the following international organisations:
 AALCO – Asian–African Legal Consultative Organization
 ADB – Asian Development Bank
 AfDB – African Development Bank (non-regional members)
 AG – Australia Group
 ASEAN Regional Forum
 ASEAN (dialogue partner)
 BIMSTEC – Bay of Bengal Initiative for Multi-Sectoral Technical and Economic Cooperation
 BIS – Bank for International Settlements
 BRICS – Brazil, Russia, India, China and South Africa
 Commonwealth of Nations
 CERN – European Organization for Nuclear Research
 CP – Colombo Plan
 EAS – East Asia Summit
 FAO – Food and Agriculture Organization of the United Nations
 G-4
 G-15
 G-20
 G-24
 G-77
 IAEA – International Atomic Energy Agency
 IBRD – International Bank for Reconstruction and Development (World Bank)
 ICAO – International Civil Aviation Organization
 ICC – International Chamber of Commerce
 ICRM – International Red Cross and Red Crescent Movement
 IDA – International Development Association
 IEA – International Energy Agency
 IFAD – International Fund for Agricultural Development
 IFC – International Finance Corporation
 IFRCS – International Federation of Red Cross and Red Crescent Societies
 IHO – International Hydrographic Organization
 ILO – International Labour Organization
 IMF – International Monetary Fund
 IMO – International Maritime Organization
 IMSO – International Mobile Satellite Organization
 Interpol – International Criminal Police Organization
 IOC – International Olympic Committee
 IOM – International Organization for Migration (observer)
 IPEEC – International Partnership for Energy Efficiency Cooperation
 IPU – Inter-Parliamentary Union
 ISA – International Solar Alliance
 ISO – International Organization for Standardization
 ITSO – International Telecommunications Satellite Organization
 ITU – International Telecommunication Union
 ITUC – International Trade Union Confederation (the successor to ICFTU (International Confederation of Free Trade Unions) and the WCL (World Confederation of Labour))
 LAS – League of Arab States (observer)
 MIGA – Multilateral Investment Guarantee Agency
 MTCR – Missile Technology Control Regime
 NAM – Non-Aligned Movement
 OAS – Organization of American States (observer)
 OPCW – Organisation for the Prohibition of Chemical Weapons
 PCA – Permanent Court of Arbitration
 PIF – Pacific Islands Forum (partner)
 SAARC – South Asian Association for Regional Cooperation
 SACEP – South Asia Co-operative Environment Programme
 SCO – Shanghai Cooperation Organisation (member)
 UN – United Nations
 UNAIDS- United Nations Programme on HIV/AIDS
 UNCTAD – United Nations Conference on Trade and Development
 UNDOF – United Nations Disengagement Observer Force
 UNESCO – United Nations Educational, Scientific and Cultural Organization
 UNHCR – United Nations High Commissioner for Refugees
 UNIDO – United Nations Industrial Development Organization
 UNIFIL – United Nations Interim Force in Lebanon
 UNMEE – United Nations Mission in Ethiopia and Eritrea
 UNMIS – United Nations Mission in Sudan
 UNOCI – United Nations Operation in Côte d'Ivoire
 MONUSCO – United Nations Organization Mission in the Democratic Republic of the Congo
 UNWTO – World Tourism Organization
 UPU – Universal Postal Union
 WA – Wassenaar Arrangement
 WCL – World Confederation of Labour
 WCO – World Customs Organization
 WFTU – World Federation of Trade Unions
 WHO – World Health Organization
 WIPO – World Intellectual Property Organization
 WMO – World Meteorological Organization
 WTO – World Trade Organization   

India and the Commonwealth

India became independent within the British Commonwealth in August 1947 as the Dominion of India after the partition of India into India and the Dominion of Pakistan. King George VI, the last Emperor of India became the King of India with the Governor-General of India as his viceregal representative.

India became the very first Commonwealth republic on 26 January 1950, as a result of the London Declaration.

Non-Aligned Movement

India played an important role in the multilateral movements of colonies and newly independent countries that developed into the Non-Aligned Movement.
Nonalignment had its origins in India's colonial experience and the nonviolent Indian independence movement led by the Congress, which left India determined to be the master of its fate in an international system dominated politically by Cold War alliances and economically by Western capitalism and Soviet communism. The principles of nonalignment, as articulated by Nehru and his successors, were preservation of India's freedom of action internationally through refusal to align India with any bloc or alliance, particularly those led by the United States or the Soviet Union; nonviolence and international co-operation as a means of settling international disputes. Nonalignment was a consistent feature of Indian foreign policy by the late 1940s and enjoyed strong, almost unquestioning support among the Indian elite.

The term "Non-Alignment" was coined by V K Menon in his speech at UN in 1953 which was later used by Indian Prime Minister, Jawaharlal Nehru during his speech in 1954 in Colombo, Sri Lanka. In this speech, Nehru described the five pillars to be used as a guide for China–India relations, which were first put forth by PRC Premier Zhou Enlai. Called Panchsheel (five restraints), these principles would later serve as the basis of the Non-Aligned Movement. The five principles were:
 Mutual respect for each other's territorial integrity and sovereignty
 Mutual non-aggression
 Mutual non-interference in domestic affairs
 Equality and mutual benefit
 Peaceful co-existence

Jawaharlal Nehru's concept of nonalignment brought India considerable international prestige among newly independent states that shared India's concerns about the military confrontation between the superpowers and the influence of the former colonial powers. New Delhi used nonalignment to establish a significant role for itself as a leader of the newly independent world in such multilateral organisations as the United Nations (UN) and the Nonaligned Movement. The signing of the Treaty of Peace, Friendship, and Cooperation between India and the Soviet Union in 1971 and India's involvement in the internal affairs of its smaller neighbours in the 1970s and 1980s tarnished New Delhi's image as a nonaligned nation and led some observers to note that in practice, nonalignment applied only to India's relations with countries outside South Asia.

Quad Alliance

The Quadrilateral Security Dialogue (QSD, also known as the Quad) is an informal strategic dialogue between the United States, India, Japan and Australia that is maintained by talks between member countries. The dialogue was initiated in 2007 by Japanese Prime Minister Shinzo Abe, with the support American Vice President Dick Cheney, Australian Prime Minister John Howard and Former Indian Prime Minister Manmohan Singh. The dialogue was paralleled by joint military exercises of an unprecedented scale, titled Exercise Malabar. The diplomatic and military arrangement was widely viewed as a response to increased Chinese economic and military power.

On 12 March 2021 the first summit meeting was held virtually between U.S President Joe Biden, Indian Prime Minister Narendra Modi, Japanese Prime Minister Yoshihide Suga and Australian Prime Minister Scott Morrison.

United Nations

India was among the original members of the United Nations that signed the Declaration by United Nations at Washington on 1 January 1942 and also participated in the United Nations Conference on International Organization at San Francisco from 25 April to 26 June 1945. As a founding member of the United Nations, India strongly supports the purposes and principles of the UN and has made significant contributions to implementing the goals of the Charter, and the evolution of the UN's specialised programmes and agencies. India is a charter member of the United Nations and participates in all of its specialised agencies and organisations. India has contributed troops to United Nations peacekeeping efforts in Korea, Egypt and the Congo in its earlier years and in Somalia, Angola, Haiti, Liberia, Lebanon and Rwanda in recent years, and more recently in the South Sudan conflict. India has been a member of the UN Security Council for eight terms (a total of 16 years). India is a member of the G4 group of nations who back each other in seeking a permanent seat on the security council and advocate in favour of the reformation of the UNSC. India is also part of the Group of 77.

World Trade Organization

Described by the WTO's former chief, Pascal Lamy, as one of the organisation's "big brothers", India was instrumental in bringing down the Doha Development Round of talks in 2008. It has played an important role of representing as many as 100 developing nations during WTO summits.

Former
Soviet Union

The dissolution of the Soviet Union and the emergence of the Commonwealth of Independent States (CIS) had major repercussions for Indian foreign policy. Substantial trade with the former Soviet Union plummeted after the Soviet collapse and has yet to recover. Longstanding military supply relationships were similarly disrupted due to questions over financing, although Russia continues to be India's largest supplier of military systems and spare parts.

The relationship with USSR was tested (and proven) during the 1971 war with Pakistan, which led to the subsequent liberation of Bangladesh. Soon after the victory of the Indian Armed Forces, one of the foreign delegates to visit India was Admiral S.G. Gorshkov, Chief of the Soviet Navy. During his visit to Mumbai (Bombay) he came on board INS Vikrant. During a conversation with Vice Admiral Swaraj Prakash, Gorshkov asked the Vice Admiral, "Were you worried about a battle against the American carrier?" He answered himself: "Well, you had no reason to be worried, as I had a Soviet nuclear submarine trailing the American task force all the way into the Indian Ocean."

Yugoslavia

India had formal relations with Socialist Federal Republic of Yugoslavia until 1992 with the Breakup of Yugoslavia.

Border disputes

India's territorial disputes with neighbouring Pakistan and People's Republic of China have played a crucial role in its foreign policy. India is also involved in minor territorial disputes with neighbouring Bangladesh, Nepal and Maldives. India currently maintains two manned stations in Antarctica but has made some unofficial territorial claims, which are yet to be clarified.

India is involved in the following border disputes:

Nepal
Kalapani village of India is claimed by Nepal and Susta village in Nawalparasi district of Nepal is claimed by India. Indian forces occupied the area in 1962 after China and India fought their border war. Three villages are located in the disputed zone: Kuti [Kuthi, 30°19'N, 80°46'E], Gunji, and Knabe. India and Nepal disagree about how to interpret the 1816 Sugauli treaty between the British East India Company and Nepal, which delimited the boundary along the Maha Kali River (Sarda River in India). The dispute intensified in 1997 as the Nepali parliament considered a treaty on hydro-electric development of the river. India and Nepal differ as to which stream constitutes the source of the river. Nepal regards the Limpiyadhura as the source; India claims the Lipu Lekh. Nepal has reportedly tabled an 1856 map from the British India Office to support its position. The countries have held several meetings about the dispute and discussed jointly surveying to resolve the issue. Although the Indo-Nepali dispute appears to be minor, it was aggravated in 1962 by tensions between China and India. Because the disputed area lies near the Sino-Indian frontier, it gains strategic value.

Pakistan

 The unresolved Kashmir conflict and the status of Kashmir with India: Pakistan claims that it is a disputed territory with India, meanwhile Pakistan claims its side of the disputed territory and calls it "Azad Kashmir".
Dispute over Sir Creek and the maritime boundary regarding the Rann of Kachchh area of southern tip of Sindh.
 Water-sharing problems with Pakistan over the Indus River (Wular Barrage). (Indus Waters Treaty)

China
 India claims Aksai Chin and Trans-Karakoram Tract, as part of Ladakh.
 China claims most of Arunachal Pradesh, a contested disputed territory of north-east India by not recognising the McMahon Line.
Two regions are claimed by both India and China. Aksai Chin is in the disputed territory of Ladakh, at the junction of India, Tibet and Xinjiang, India claims the 38,000-square-kilometre territory, currently administered by China after Sino-Indian War. India also considers the cessation of Shaksam Valley to China by Pakistan as illegal and a part of its territory.
Arunachal Pradesh is a state of India in the country's northeast, bordering on Bhutan, Burma and China's Tibet, though it is under Indian administration since 1914, China claims the 90,000-square-kilometre area as South Tibet. Also the boundary between the North Indian states of Himachal Pradesh and Uttarakhand with China's Tibet is not properly demarcated with some portions under de facto administration of India.

Diplomatic relations with India through philately

List of countries commemorating anniversaries of diplomatic relations with India through philately

See also

 India and the United Nations
 India and the Non-Aligned Movement
 Cold War in Asia#India, 1947-1991
 List of diplomatic missions in India
 List of diplomatic missions of India
 List of diplomatic visits to India
 List of Republic of India extradition treaties
 Research and Analysis Wing
 Visa policy of India
 Visa requirements for Indian citizens

Notes

Explanatory notes

Citations

Further reading

 Abraham, Itty. "From Bandung to NAM: Non-alignment and Indian foreign policy, 1947–65." Commonwealth & Comparative Politics 46.2 (2008): 195–219.
 Bajpai, Kanti, Selina Ho, and Manjari Chatterjee Miller, eds. Routledge Handbook of China–India Relations (Routledge, 2020). excerpt
 Brands, H. W. India and the United States: The Cold Peace (1990) online free to borrow
 Bradnock, Robert W.  India's Foreign Policy Since 1971 (1990) 128pp; by a geographer
 Budhwar, Prem K. "India-Russia relations: Past, Present and the future." India Quarterly 63.3 (2007): 51–83.
 Budhwar, Prem K. et al. "India-Canada Relations: a Roller-Coaster Ride." Indian Foreign Affairs Journal 13.1 (2018): 1–50. essays by seven experts.online
 Chacko, Priya. Indian foreign policy: the politics of postcolonial identity from 1947 to 2004 (Routledge, 2013).
 Chakma, Bhumitra, ed. The politics of nuclear weapons in South Asia (Ashgate, 2011).
 Chaudhuri, Rudra. Forged In Crisis: India and the United States since 1947 (2014)
 Cohen, Stephen P., and Sunil Dasgupta. Arming Without Aiming: India's Military Modernisation (2010)  excerpt and text search
 Fonseca, Rena. "Nehru and the Diplomacy of Nonalignment." The Diplomats, 1939-1979 (Princeton University Press, 2019) pp. 371–397. online
 Gaan, Narottam. India and the United States: from Estrangement to Engagement (2007)
 Ganguly, Sumit. India's Foreign Policy: Retrospect and Prospect (2012)
 Ganguly, Sumit. "Has Modi Truly Changed India's Foreign Policy?." The Washington Quarterly 40.2 (2017): 131–143.
 Gopal, Sarvepalli. Jawaharlal Nehru: 1947–56 v.2: A Biography (1979); Jawaharlal Nehru: Vol.3: 1956–1964: A Biography (1984), a major scholarly biography with full coverage of foreign policy
 Gould, Harold A. The South Asia story: The first sixty years of US relations with India and Pakistan (SAGE Publications India, 2010).
 Guha, Ramachandra. India After Gandhi: The History of the World's Largest Democracy (2008)  excerpt and text search
 Gupta, Surupa, et al. "Indian Foreign Policy under Modi: A New Brand or Just Repackaging?." International Studies Perspectives 20.1 (2019): 1–45. online
 Heimsath, Charles H.,  and Surjit Mansingh. Diplomatic History of Modern India (1971), major scholarly history online
 Jain, B. M. Global Power: India's Foreign Policy, 1947–2006 (2009)
 Jain, Rashmi K. The United States and India: 1947–2006 A Documentary Study (2007)
 Karunakaran, K.P. India in World Affairs, August 1947 – January 1950 (1952)
 Karunakaran, K.P. India in World Affairs, Feb. 1950– Dec. 1953. Calcutta. (1958), 
 Kust, Matthew J. Foreign Enterprise in India: Laws and Policies (2011)
 Mallavarapu, Siddharth. "Development of international relations theory in India." International Studies 46.1–2 (2009): 165–183.
 Malone, David. Does the Elephant Dance?: Contemporary Indian Foreign Policy (2011)  excerpt and text search
 Malone, David et al. eds. The Oxford Handbook of Indian Foreign Policy. (2015) excerpt; a comprehensive overview by over 50 leading experts.
 Mansinghm Surjit. India's Search for Power: Indira Gandhi's Foreign Policy 1966–1982 (1984)
 Mansinghm Surjit. Nehru's foreign policy, fifty years on (1998)
 Michael, Arndt. India's Foreign Policy and Regional Multilateralism (Palgrave Macmillan, 2013) excerpt
 Miller, Manjari Chatterjee, and Kate Sullivan de Estrada. "Pragmatism in Indian foreign policy: how ideas constrain Modi." International Affairs 93.1 (2017): 27–49.   online
 Mukherjee, Mithi. "'A World of Illusion': The Legacy of Empire in India's Foreign Relations, 1947–62." International History Review 32.2 (2010): 253–271.   online free
 Muni, S. D. India's Foreign Policy: The Democracy Dimension (2009)
 Pant, Harsh V., and Julie M. Super. "India's 'non-alignment' conundrum: a twentieth-century policy in a changing world." International Affairs 91.4 (2015): 747–764.
 Pant, Harsh, and Yogesh Joshi. The US Pivot and Indian Foreign Policy: Asia's Evolving Balance of Power (Springer, 2015).
 Raghavan, Srinath. The Most Dangerous Place: A History of the United States in South Asia. (Penguin Random House India, 2018); also published as Fierce Enigmas: A History of the United States in South Asia.(2018). online review; also see excerpt
 Sathasivam, Kanishkan. Uneasy Neighbors: India, Pakistan and US Foreign Policy (Routledge, 2017).
 Schaffer, Teresita C. India and the United States in the 21st Century: Reinventing Partnership (2009)
  Shukla, Subhash. "Foreign Policy Of India Under Narasimha Rao Government" (PhD dissertation, U of Allahabad, 1999)   online free, bibliography pp 488–523.
 Singh, Sangeeta. "Trends in India's Foreign Policy: 1991–2009." (PhD dissertation, Aligarh Muslim University, 2016) online,  bibliography  pp 270–86.
 Sridharan, Eswaran. "Where is India headed? Possible future directions in Indian foreign policy." International Affairs 93.1 (2017): 51–68.
 Tharoor, Shashi. Reasons of state: political development and India's foreign policy under Indira Gandhi, 1966-1977 (1982) online

External links
 Briefs on India's Bilateral Relations, Ministry of External Affairs
 Harvard University homepage  India's Foreign Policy, Xenia Dormandy
 List of Treaties ruling relations Argentina and India (Argentine Foreign Ministry, in Spanish)
 IBSA – India, Brazil, South Africa – News and Media

 
India and the Commonwealth of Nations